This is a partial list of unnumbered minor planets for principal provisional designations assigned during 1–15 September 2004. Since this period yielded a high number of provisional discoveries, it is further split into several standalone pages. , a total of 433 bodies remain unnumbered for this period. Objects for this year are listed on the following pages: A–B · C · D–E · F · G–H · J–O · P–Q · Ri · Rii · Riii · S · Ti · Tii · Tiii · Tiv · U–V · W–X and Y. Also see previous and next year.

R 

|- id="2004 RC" bgcolor=#fefefe
| 0 || 2004 RC || MBA-I || 18.91 || data-sort-value="0.49" | 490 m || multiple || 2004–2021 || 02 Jun 2021 || 37 || align=left | Disc.: Table Mountain Obs. || 
|- id="2004 RS" bgcolor=#FA8072
| 0 || 2004 RS || MCA || 17.52 || data-sort-value="0.93" | 930 m || multiple || 2004–2022 || 25 Jan 2022 || 72 || align=left | Disc.: LONEOS || 
|- id="2004 RA1" bgcolor=#E9E9E9
| 0 ||  || MBA-M || 17.88 || 1.1 km || multiple || 2004–2021 || 27 Nov 2021 || 124 || align=left | Disc.: George Obs.Alt.: 2017 TC3 || 
|- id="2004 RG1" bgcolor=#FA8072
| 0 ||  || MCA || 16.6 || 2.0 km || multiple || 1982–2021 || 08 Jun 2021 || 198 || align=left | Disc.: NEAT || 
|- id="2004 RW1" bgcolor=#FA8072
| 1 ||  || MCA || 18.1 || data-sort-value="0.71" | 710 m || multiple || 2004–2018 || 10 Jul 2018 || 73 || align=left | Disc.: LINEARAlt.: 2018 MK6 || 
|- id="2004 RM2" bgcolor=#fefefe
| 0 ||  || MBA-I || 18.09 || data-sort-value="0.72" | 720 m || multiple || 2004–2019 || 30 Nov 2019 || 82 || align=left | Disc.: NEAT || 
|- id="2004 RV2" bgcolor=#FFC2E0
| 2 ||  || AMO || 20.7 || data-sort-value="0.26" | 260 m || multiple || 2004–2020 || 22 Mar 2020 || 121 || align=left | Disc.: LINEAR || 
|- id="2004 RW2" bgcolor=#FFC2E0
| 5 ||  || APO || 24.4 || data-sort-value="0.047" | 47 m || single || 11 days || 17 Sep 2004 || 64 || align=left | Disc.: LINEAR || 
|- id="2004 RC4" bgcolor=#fefefe
| 0 ||  || MBA-I || 17.44 || data-sort-value="0.97" | 970 m || multiple || 2004–2021 || 01 Jul 2021 || 191 || align=left | Disc.: NEAT || 
|- id="2004 RF4" bgcolor=#E9E9E9
| 0 ||  || MBA-M || 18.1 || 1.0 km || multiple || 2004–2017 || 16 Aug 2017 || 36 || align=left | Disc.: NEAT || 
|- id="2004 RM4" bgcolor=#fefefe
| 0 ||  || MBA-I || 17.9 || data-sort-value="0.78" | 780 m || multiple || 2004–2020 || 07 Dec 2020 || 158 || align=left | Disc.: NEATAlt.: 2007 NC4, 2010 KZ8, 2013 HT16 || 
|- id="2004 RN4" bgcolor=#E9E9E9
| 0 ||  || MBA-M || 16.46 || 1.5 km || multiple || 2004–2022 || 17 Jan 2022 || 297 || align=left | Disc.: NEAT || 
|- id="2004 RQ4" bgcolor=#fefefe
| 0 ||  || MBA-I || 17.48 || data-sort-value="0.95" | 950 m || multiple || 2004–2021 || 13 Apr 2021 || 193 || align=left | Disc.: NEAT || 
|- id="2004 RJ5" bgcolor=#E9E9E9
| 0 ||  || MBA-M || 17.02 || 1.7 km || multiple || 2000–2021 || 23 Oct 2021 || 256 || align=left | Disc.: NEATAlt.: 2015 BZ438 || 
|- id="2004 RL5" bgcolor=#fefefe
| 0 ||  || MBA-I || 17.5 || data-sort-value="0.94" | 940 m || multiple || 2003–2020 || 26 Feb 2020 || 139 || align=left | Disc.: NEAT || 
|- id="2004 RD6" bgcolor=#fefefe
| 0 ||  || MBA-I || 17.33 || 1.0 km || multiple || 2003–2021 || 29 Apr 2021 || 127 || align=left | Disc.: NEAT || 
|- id="2004 RM6" bgcolor=#FA8072
| 0 ||  || MCA || 18.1 || data-sort-value="0.71" | 710 m || multiple || 2004–2020 || 21 Jun 2020 || 96 || align=left | Disc.: NEAT || 
|- id="2004 RR6" bgcolor=#d6d6d6
| 0 ||  || MBA-O || 16.05 || 3.4 km || multiple || 2004–2021 || 05 Dec 2021 || 159 || align=left | Disc.: NEATAlt.: 2015 PZ306 || 
|- id="2004 RK7" bgcolor=#E9E9E9
| 1 ||  || MBA-M || 18.18 || data-sort-value="0.69" | 690 m || multiple || 2004–2021 || 01 Dec 2021 || 53 || align=left | Disc.: NEATAlt.: 2021 RJ26 || 
|- id="2004 RF8" bgcolor=#fefefe
| 0 ||  || MBA-I || 18.46 || data-sort-value="0.60" | 600 m || multiple || 2004–2021 || 30 Nov 2021 || 153 || align=left | Disc.: Altschwendt Obs.Alt.: 2011 UP317 || 
|- id="2004 RW8" bgcolor=#E9E9E9
| 0 ||  || MBA-M || 16.4 || 2.9 km || multiple || 1995–2020 || 23 Apr 2020 || 222 || align=left | Disc.: Goodricke-Pigott Obs.Alt.: 2013 RV18 || 
|- id="2004 RH9" bgcolor=#FA8072
| 0 ||  || MCA || 16.99 || 1.2 km || multiple || 2004–2021 || 02 Nov 2021 || 93 || align=left | Disc.: LINEARAlt.: 2008 LR16 || 
|- id="2004 RJ9" bgcolor=#FFC2E0
| 7 ||  || AMO || 19.9 || data-sort-value="0.37" | 370 m || single || 34 days || 10 Oct 2004 || 51 || align=left | Disc.: LINEAR || 
|- id="2004 RL9" bgcolor=#FA8072
| 2 ||  || MCA || 19.3 || data-sort-value="0.41" | 410 m || multiple || 2004–2016 || 08 Jan 2016 || 76 || align=left | Disc.: LINEARAlt.: 2015 VB121 || 
|- id="2004 RM9" bgcolor=#FA8072
| 2 ||  || MCA || 19.3 || data-sort-value="0.41" | 410 m || multiple || 2004–2020 || 19 Aug 2020 || 51 || align=left | Disc.: LINEAR || 
|- id="2004 RP9" bgcolor=#fefefe
| 0 ||  || MBA-I || 17.1 || 1.1 km || multiple || 2004–2020 || 15 Feb 2020 || 186 || align=left | Disc.: LINEAR || 
|- id="2004 RQ9" bgcolor=#fefefe
| 1 ||  || HUN || 18.2 || data-sort-value="0.68" | 680 m || multiple || 2004–2020 || 05 Jan 2020 || 143 || align=left | Disc.: LINEARAlt.: 2013 BN17 || 
|- id="2004 RT9" bgcolor=#E9E9E9
| – ||  || MBA-M || 17.4 || data-sort-value="0.98" | 980 m || single || 9 days || 15 Sep 2004 || 16 || align=left | Disc.: LINEAR || 
|- id="2004 RV9" bgcolor=#FA8072
| 0 ||  || MCA || 17.6 || 1.7 km || multiple || 2004–2019 || 24 Jan 2019 || 107 || align=left | Disc.: LINEARAlt.: 2010 AP74 || 
|- id="2004 RZ9" bgcolor=#FA8072
| 0 ||  || MCA || 19.34 || data-sort-value="0.40" | 400 m || multiple || 2004–2021 || 01 Oct 2021 || 56 || align=left | Disc.: LINEAR || 
|- id="2004 RC10" bgcolor=#FA8072
| 0 ||  || MCA || 18.0 || 1.4 km || multiple || 2004–2018 || 13 Aug 2018 || 80 || align=left | Disc.: LINEAR || 
|- id="2004 RJ10" bgcolor=#FA8072
| 0 ||  || MCA || 17.70 || 1.2 km || multiple || 2004–2021 || 08 Sep 2021 || 125 || align=left | Disc.: LINEAR || 
|- id="2004 RL10" bgcolor=#fefefe
| 0 ||  || HUN || 18.74 || data-sort-value="0.53" | 530 m || multiple || 2004–2021 || 16 Apr 2021 || 66 || align=left | Disc.: Spacewatch || 
|- id="2004 RM10" bgcolor=#FA8072
| 1 ||  || MCA || 18.4 || data-sort-value="0.62" | 620 m || multiple || 2004–2021 || 18 Jan 2021 || 98 || align=left | Disc.: NEAT || 
|- id="2004 RP10" bgcolor=#d6d6d6
| – ||  || MBA-O || 18.2 || 1.3 km || single || 10 days || 17 Sep 2004 || 25 || align=left | Disc.: Spacewatch || 
|- id="2004 RQ10" bgcolor=#FFC2E0
| 4 ||  || AMO || 20.9 || data-sort-value="0.23" | 230 m || single || 72 days || 19 Nov 2004 || 548 || align=left | Disc.: LINEARPotentially hazardous object || 
|- id="2004 RW10" bgcolor=#FFC2E0
| 1 ||  || APO || 20.9 || data-sort-value="0.23" | 230 m || multiple || 2004–2015 || 06 Nov 2015 || 75 || align=left | Disc.: LINEARPotentially hazardous object || 
|- id="2004 RY10" bgcolor=#FFC2E0
| 1 ||  || APO || 21.1 || data-sort-value="0.21" | 210 m || multiple || 2004–2020 || 17 Apr 2020 || 114 || align=left | Disc.: Apache PointPotentially hazardous object || 
|- id="2004 RZ10" bgcolor=#FA8072
| – ||  || MCA || 19.3 || data-sort-value="0.41" | 410 m || single || 16 days || 24 Sep 2004 || 67 || align=left | Disc.: LINEAR || 
|- id="2004 RB11" bgcolor=#FFC2E0
| 5 ||  || AMO || 23.7 || data-sort-value="0.065" | 65 m || single || 70 days || 17 Nov 2004 || 62 || align=left | Disc.: LINEAR || 
|- id="2004 RC11" bgcolor=#FFC2E0
| 8 ||  || APO || 23.6 || data-sort-value="0.068" | 68 m || single || 28 days || 06 Oct 2004 || 49 || align=left | Disc.: LINEAR || 
|- id="2004 RD11" bgcolor=#E9E9E9
| – ||  || MBA-M || 18.3 || data-sort-value="0.65" | 650 m || single || 5 days || 13 Sep 2004 || 19 || align=left | Disc.: LINEAR || 
|- id="2004 RV11" bgcolor=#E9E9E9
| 0 ||  || MBA-M || 18.00 || 1.1 km || multiple || 2004–2021 || 09 Dec 2021 || 123 || align=left | Disc.: NEATAlt.: 2016 FU25 || 
|- id="2004 RW11" bgcolor=#d6d6d6
| 1 ||  || MBA-O || 17.43 || 2.4 km || multiple || 2004–2021 || 11 Apr 2021 || 147 || align=left | Disc.: Goodricke-Pigott Obs.Alt.: 2009 WD266 || 
|- id="2004 RP12" bgcolor=#d6d6d6
| 1 ||  || MBA-O || 16.9 || 2.3 km || multiple || 2004–2017 || 29 Jan 2017 || 113 || align=left | Disc.: LINEAR || 
|- id="2004 RR13" bgcolor=#fefefe
| 0 ||  || MBA-I || 17.88 || data-sort-value="0.79" | 790 m || multiple || 2004–2021 || 24 Sep 2021 || 138 || align=left | Disc.: George Obs. || 
|- id="2004 RK14" bgcolor=#E9E9E9
| 0 ||  || MBA-M || 18.11 || 1.0 km || multiple || 2004–2021 || 01 Nov 2021 || 151 || align=left | Disc.: SSS || 
|- id="2004 RU14" bgcolor=#fefefe
| 1 ||  || MBA-I || 18.0 || data-sort-value="0.75" | 750 m || multiple || 2004–2019 || 12 Dec 2019 || 80 || align=left | Disc.: SSS || 
|- id="2004 RW14" bgcolor=#fefefe
| 1 ||  || MBA-I || 18.2 || data-sort-value="0.68" | 680 m || multiple || 2002–2020 || 22 Mar 2020 || 64 || align=left | Disc.: SSSAlt.: 2011 QL90 || 
|- id="2004 RE15" bgcolor=#E9E9E9
| 2 ||  || MBA-M || 17.8 || 1.2 km || multiple || 2004–2017 || 20 Nov 2017 || 85 || align=left | Disc.: SSSAlt.: 2017 SN1 || 
|- id="2004 RQ15" bgcolor=#E9E9E9
| – ||  || MBA-M || 16.9 || 1.2 km || single || 8 days || 15 Sep 2004 || 8 || align=left | Disc.: LINEAR || 
|- id="2004 RM16" bgcolor=#E9E9E9
| 0 ||  || MBA-M || 17.22 || 1.1 km || multiple || 2004–2021 || 08 Dec 2021 || 140 || align=left | Disc.: LINEAR || 
|- id="2004 RF17" bgcolor=#E9E9E9
| 0 ||  || MBA-M || 18.33 || data-sort-value="0.91" | 910 m || multiple || 2004–2021 || 07 Jul 2021 || 59 || align=left | Disc.: Spacewatch || 
|- id="2004 RV17" bgcolor=#d6d6d6
| 0 ||  || MBA-O || 16.5 || 2.8 km || multiple || 2004–2020 || 15 Dec 2020 || 135 || align=left | Disc.: SpacewatchAlt.: 2012 DB75 || 
|- id="2004 RZ17" bgcolor=#E9E9E9
| 2 ||  || MBA-M || 18.5 || data-sort-value="0.59" | 590 m || multiple || 2004–2021 || 08 Dec 2021 || 40 || align=left | Disc.: Spacewatch || 
|- id="2004 RL18" bgcolor=#d6d6d6
| 0 ||  || MBA-O || 16.32 || 3.0 km || multiple || 2002–2022 || 06 Jan 2022 || 145 || align=left | Disc.: LINEARAlt.: 2013 EZ53 || 
|- id="2004 RQ18" bgcolor=#E9E9E9
| 1 ||  || MBA-M || 17.4 || 1.8 km || multiple || 2004–2020 || 16 Feb 2020 || 77 || align=left | Disc.: SpacewatchAlt.: 2018 SC6 || 
|- id="2004 RY18" bgcolor=#fefefe
| 0 ||  || MBA-I || 18.69 || data-sort-value="0.54" | 540 m || multiple || 2004–2019 || 28 Nov 2019 || 57 || align=left | Disc.: Spacewatch || 
|- id="2004 RN19" bgcolor=#E9E9E9
| 2 ||  || MBA-M || 18.0 || 1.4 km || multiple || 2002–2013 || 23 Sep 2013 || 41 || align=left | Disc.: SpacewatchAlt.: 2013 SB11 || 
|- id="2004 RZ19" bgcolor=#E9E9E9
| 0 ||  || MBA-M || 17.45 || data-sort-value="0.96" | 960 m || multiple || 2004–2022 || 06 Jan 2022 || 62 || align=left | Disc.: LINEAR || 
|- id="2004 RS20" bgcolor=#fefefe
| – ||  || MBA-I || 18.9 || data-sort-value="0.49" | 490 m || single || 5 days || 12 Sep 2004 || 10 || align=left | Disc.: Spacewatch || 
|- id="2004 RC22" bgcolor=#fefefe
| 1 ||  || MBA-I || 18.4 || data-sort-value="0.62" | 620 m || multiple || 2004–2020 || 21 Jun 2020 || 78 || align=left | Disc.: SpacewatchAlt.: 2014 SA258, 2014 UM206 || 
|- id="2004 RD23" bgcolor=#fefefe
| 0 ||  || MBA-I || 17.7 || data-sort-value="0.86" | 860 m || multiple || 2004–2021 || 18 Jan 2021 || 123 || align=left | Disc.: SpacewatchAlt.: 2008 ST55 || 
|- id="2004 RE23" bgcolor=#E9E9E9
| 0 ||  || MBA-M || 17.91 || data-sort-value="0.78" | 780 m || multiple || 2004–2021 || 10 Nov 2021 || 42 || align=left | Disc.: Spacewatch || 
|- id="2004 RS23" bgcolor=#E9E9E9
| 0 ||  || MBA-M || 17.16 || 2.1 km || multiple || 2004–2021 || 03 May 2021 || 101 || align=left | Disc.: Uccle Obs. || 
|- id="2004 RU23" bgcolor=#d6d6d6
| 0 ||  || MBA-O || 16.96 || 2.3 km || multiple || 2004–2022 || 26 Jan 2022 || 229 || align=left | Disc.: LINEAR || 
|- id="2004 RZ23" bgcolor=#FA8072
| – ||  || MCA || 19.4 || data-sort-value="0.55" | 550 m || single || 9 days || 17 Sep 2004 || 29 || align=left | Disc.: LINEAR || 
|- id="2004 RA24" bgcolor=#FA8072
| 0 ||  || MCA || 17.79 || 1.2 km || multiple || 2004–2019 || 05 Feb 2019 || 108 || align=left | Disc.: LINEAR || 
|- id="2004 RD24" bgcolor=#FA8072
| 1 ||  || MCA || 17.1 || 1.6 km || multiple || 2004–2017 || 06 Nov 2017 || 77 || align=left | Disc.: SSS || 
|- id="2004 RH24" bgcolor=#FA8072
| – ||  || MCA || 18.6 || data-sort-value="0.57" | 570 m || single || 10 days || 18 Sep 2004 || 19 || align=left | Disc.: LINEAR || 
|- id="2004 RO24" bgcolor=#FA8072
| 0 ||  || MCA || 18.07 || data-sort-value="0.72" | 720 m || multiple || 2004–2021 || 08 Aug 2021 || 152 || align=left | Disc.: LINEARAlt.: 2011 QA18 || 
|- id="2004 RR24" bgcolor=#fefefe
| 1 ||  || MBA-I || 17.9 || data-sort-value="0.78" | 780 m || multiple || 2000–2019 || 23 Oct 2019 || 107 || align=left | Disc.: KLENOT || 
|- id="2004 RT24" bgcolor=#fefefe
| 0 ||  || MBA-I || 17.4 || data-sort-value="0.98" | 980 m || multiple || 1997–2021 || 11 Jun 2021 || 262 || align=left | Disc.: KLENOT || 
|- id="2004 RZ24" bgcolor=#E9E9E9
| 0 ||  || MBA-M || 17.77 || 1.2 km || multiple || 2004–2021 || 10 Oct 2021 || 120 || align=left | Disc.: St. Veran Obs. || 
|- id="2004 RJ25" bgcolor=#fefefe
| 0 ||  || MBA-I || 17.4 || data-sort-value="0.98" | 980 m || multiple || 2004–2021 || 16 Jan 2021 || 51 || align=left | Disc.: SSSAlt.: 2018 CZ22 || 
|- id="2004 RN25" bgcolor=#FA8072
| 3 ||  || HUN || 18.6 || data-sort-value="0.57" | 570 m || multiple || 2004–2020 || 24 Oct 2020 || 48 || align=left | Disc.: LINEARAlt.: 2020 SM16 || 
|- id="2004 RS25" bgcolor=#FFC2E0
| 1 ||  || AMO || 20.2 || data-sort-value="0.32" | 320 m || multiple || 2004–2010 || 15 Apr 2010 || 137 || align=left | Disc.: Spacewatch || 
|- id="2004 RY26" bgcolor=#fefefe
| 2 ||  || MBA-I || 18.4 || data-sort-value="0.62" | 620 m || multiple || 2004–2015 || 25 Apr 2015 || 35 || align=left | Disc.: NEATAlt.: 2008 RJ96, 2015 HS145 || 
|- id="2004 RL27" bgcolor=#E9E9E9
| 0 ||  || MBA-M || 16.5 || 2.8 km || multiple || 1995–2020 || 12 Apr 2020 || 115 || align=left | Disc.: NEATAlt.: 2011 EK9 || 
|- id="2004 RQ29" bgcolor=#d6d6d6
| 3 ||  || MBA-O || 16.9 || 2.3 km || multiple || 2004–2010 || 26 Apr 2010 || 20 || align=left | Disc.: LINEARAlt.: 2010 HU127 || 
|- id="2004 RO30" bgcolor=#fefefe
| 1 ||  || MBA-I || 18.3 || data-sort-value="0.65" | 650 m || multiple || 1993–2019 || 05 Oct 2019 || 61 || align=left | Disc.: LINEAR || 
|- id="2004 RQ30" bgcolor=#fefefe
| 0 ||  || MBA-I || 18.71 || data-sort-value="0.54" | 540 m || multiple || 2004–2021 || 14 Jun 2021 || 88 || align=left | Disc.: LINEAR || 
|- id="2004 RF31" bgcolor=#E9E9E9
| 0 ||  || MBA-M || 17.0 || 1.7 km || multiple || 2004–2019 || 26 Feb 2019 || 66 || align=left | Disc.: LINEAR || 
|- id="2004 RB32" bgcolor=#d6d6d6
| 0 ||  || MBA-O || 16.9 || 2.3 km || multiple || 2004–2019 || 06 Apr 2019 || 144 || align=left | Disc.: LINEARAlt.: 2015 OM77 || 
|- id="2004 RN33" bgcolor=#fefefe
| 0 ||  || MBA-I || 17.7 || data-sort-value="0.86" | 860 m || multiple || 2001–2019 || 16 Dec 2019 || 144 || align=left | Disc.: LINEARAlt.: 2015 PE67, 2017 BN46 || 
|- id="2004 RU35" bgcolor=#E9E9E9
| 0 ||  || MBA-M || 17.57 || 1.3 km || multiple || 2000–2021 || 02 Aug 2021 || 69 || align=left | Disc.: LINEAR || 
|- id="2004 RU36" bgcolor=#E9E9E9
| 0 ||  || MBA-M || 17.08 || 1.6 km || multiple || 2000–2022 || 04 Jan 2022 || 231 || align=left | Disc.: LINEAR || 
|- id="2004 RS37" bgcolor=#E9E9E9
| 0 ||  || MBA-M || 17.43 || 1.4 km || multiple || 2004–2021 || 10 Aug 2021 || 113 || align=left | Disc.: LINEARAlt.: 2015 BK440 || 
|- id="2004 RJ38" bgcolor=#d6d6d6
| 0 ||  || MBA-O || 17.41 || 1.8 km || multiple || 2004–2021 || 04 Dec 2021 || 132 || align=left | Disc.: LINEAR || 
|- id="2004 RS38" bgcolor=#d6d6d6
| 0 ||  || MBA-O || 17.1 || 2.1 km || multiple || 2004–2020 || 19 Oct 2020 || 143 || align=left | Disc.: SpacewatchAdded on 13 September 2020Alt.: 2014 DY68 || 
|- id="2004 RU38" bgcolor=#fefefe
| 0 ||  || MBA-I || 18.66 || data-sort-value="0.55" | 550 m || multiple || 2004–2021 || 07 Apr 2021 || 41 || align=left | Disc.: Spacewatch || 
|- id="2004 RU39" bgcolor=#FA8072
| 1 ||  || MCA || 18.9 || data-sort-value="0.49" | 490 m || multiple || 2001–2020 || 24 Dec 2020 || 60 || align=left | Disc.: Spacewatch || 
|- id="2004 RV39" bgcolor=#fefefe
| 0 ||  || MBA-I || 18.56 || data-sort-value="0.58" | 580 m || multiple || 2004–2021 || 15 Apr 2021 || 84 || align=left | Disc.: Spacewatch || 
|- id="2004 RY39" bgcolor=#E9E9E9
| 0 ||  || MBA-M || 18.03 || 1.0 km || multiple || 2004–2021 || 03 Oct 2021 || 100 || align=left | Disc.: SpacewatchAdded on 21 August 2021 || 
|- id="2004 RH40" bgcolor=#fefefe
| 0 ||  || MBA-I || 18.80 || data-sort-value="0.52" | 520 m || multiple || 2004–2021 || 11 Oct 2021 || 97 || align=left | Disc.: Spacewatch || 
|- id="2004 RA41" bgcolor=#FA8072
| – ||  || MCA || 19.6 || data-sort-value="0.36" | 360 m || single || 4 days || 11 Sep 2004 || 10 || align=left | Disc.: Spacewatch || 
|- id="2004 RJ41" bgcolor=#fefefe
| 1 ||  || MBA-I || 18.3 || data-sort-value="0.65" | 650 m || multiple || 2004–2019 || 27 Sep 2019 || 55 || align=left | Disc.: SpacewatchAlt.: 2008 TN136 || 
|- id="2004 RQ41" bgcolor=#fefefe
| 0 ||  || MBA-I || 18.3 || data-sort-value="0.65" | 650 m || multiple || 2001–2020 || 26 Jan 2020 || 59 || align=left | Disc.: Spacewatch || 
|- id="2004 RS41" bgcolor=#E9E9E9
| 0 ||  || MBA-M || 17.4 || 1.8 km || multiple || 1995–2020 || 26 Jan 2020 || 67 || align=left | Disc.: SpacewatchAlt.: 2018 VS102 || 
|- id="2004 RZ41" bgcolor=#E9E9E9
| 0 ||  || MBA-M || 17.32 || 1.9 km || multiple || 2004–2021 || 08 Jun 2021 || 49 || align=left | Disc.: SpacewatchAlt.: 2013 VV22 || 
|- id="2004 RP43" bgcolor=#fefefe
| 1 ||  || MBA-I || 18.4 || data-sort-value="0.62" | 620 m || multiple || 2004–2019 || 06 Dec 2019 || 125 || align=left | Disc.: LINEARAlt.: 2008 VO74 || 
|- id="2004 RR43" bgcolor=#E9E9E9
| 0 ||  || MBA-M || 17.17 || 2.0 km || multiple || 1995–2021 || 17 Apr 2021 || 122 || align=left | Disc.: SpacewatchAlt.: 1995 QN11, 2013 PV12 || 
|- id="2004 RV44" bgcolor=#fefefe
| 0 ||  || MBA-I || 17.7 || data-sort-value="0.86" | 860 m || multiple || 2004–2019 || 09 Jul 2019 || 92 || align=left | Disc.: LINEARAlt.: 2015 FM299 || 
|- id="2004 RX44" bgcolor=#fefefe
| 2 ||  || MBA-I || 17.8 || data-sort-value="0.82" | 820 m || multiple || 2004–2019 || 29 Nov 2019 || 111 || align=left | Disc.: LINEAR || 
|- id="2004 RV46" bgcolor=#fefefe
| 0 ||  || MBA-I || 17.8 || data-sort-value="0.82" | 820 m || multiple || 2004–2021 || 18 Jan 2021 || 70 || align=left | Disc.: LINEAR || 
|- id="2004 RG48" bgcolor=#E9E9E9
| – ||  || MBA-M || 17.8 || 1.2 km || single || 13 days || 21 Sep 2004 || 22 || align=left | Disc.: LINEAR || 
|- id="2004 RF49" bgcolor=#E9E9E9
| 0 ||  || MBA-M || 17.27 || 1.5 km || multiple || 2004–2022 || 07 Jan 2022 || 241 || align=left | Disc.: LINEAR || 
|- id="2004 RT49" bgcolor=#fefefe
| 0 ||  || MBA-I || 18.19 || data-sort-value="0.68" | 680 m || multiple || 2004–2021 || 09 May 2021 || 204 || align=left | Disc.: LINEAR || 
|- id="2004 RU50" bgcolor=#fefefe
| 0 ||  || MBA-I || 18.4 || data-sort-value="0.62" | 620 m || multiple || 2004–2020 || 21 Jun 2020 || 113 || align=left | Disc.: LINEAR || 
|- id="2004 RY51" bgcolor=#fefefe
| 0 ||  || MBA-I || 17.86 || data-sort-value="0.80" | 800 m || multiple || 2004–2021 || 14 May 2021 || 172 || align=left | Disc.: LINEARAlt.: 2004 RY344, 2004 SG60, 2011 OM32 || 
|- id="2004 RN52" bgcolor=#E9E9E9
| 0 ||  || MBA-M || 17.92 || 1.1 km || multiple || 2004–2022 || 06 Jan 2022 || 117 || align=left | Disc.: LINEAR || 
|- id="2004 RL53" bgcolor=#E9E9E9
| 0 ||  || MBA-M || 17.70 || data-sort-value="0.86" | 860 m || multiple || 2000–2022 || 06 Jan 2022 || 116 || align=left | Disc.: LINEARAlt.: 2000 TN9 || 
|- id="2004 RO53" bgcolor=#fefefe
| 1 ||  || MBA-I || 17.8 || data-sort-value="0.82" | 820 m || multiple || 2004–2020 || 14 Dec 2020 || 40 || align=left | Disc.: LINEAR || 
|- id="2004 RU53" bgcolor=#fefefe
| 0 ||  || MBA-I || 18.52 || data-sort-value="0.59" | 590 m || multiple || 2004–2021 || 25 Nov 2021 || 145 || align=left | Disc.: LINEARAlt.: 2014 ON93 || 
|- id="2004 RF54" bgcolor=#fefefe
| 1 ||  || MBA-I || 17.9 || data-sort-value="0.78" | 780 m || multiple || 2004–2018 || 16 Sep 2018 || 36 || align=left | Disc.: LINEAR || 
|- id="2004 RE55" bgcolor=#fefefe
| 0 ||  || MBA-I || 18.63 || data-sort-value="0.56" | 560 m || multiple || 1997–2021 || 09 May 2021 || 101 || align=left | Disc.: LINEAR || 
|- id="2004 RA59" bgcolor=#d6d6d6
| 1 ||  || MBA-O || 16.5 || 2.8 km || multiple || 2004–2021 || 04 Jan 2021 || 63 || align=left | Disc.: LINEAR || 
|- id="2004 RN61" bgcolor=#fefefe
| 0 ||  || MBA-I || 17.9 || data-sort-value="0.78" | 780 m || multiple || 2004–2019 || 05 Nov 2019 || 129 || align=left | Disc.: LINEARAlt.: 2015 NA25 || 
|- id="2004 RD62" bgcolor=#fefefe
| 2 ||  || MBA-I || 18.7 || data-sort-value="0.54" | 540 m || multiple || 2004–2014 || 24 Nov 2014 || 94 || align=left | Disc.: LINEARAlt.: 2014 UM52 || 
|- id="2004 RT62" bgcolor=#fefefe
| 1 ||  || MBA-I || 18.1 || data-sort-value="0.71" | 710 m || multiple || 2004–2020 || 26 Jan 2020 || 124 || align=left | Disc.: LINEARAlt.: 2011 QA28 || 
|- id="2004 RW63" bgcolor=#E9E9E9
| 0 ||  || MBA-M || 17.55 || 1.3 km || multiple || 2004–2021 || 01 Nov 2021 || 132 || align=left | Disc.: LINEARAlt.: 2017 SK118 || 
|- id="2004 RH64" bgcolor=#d6d6d6
| 0 ||  || MBA-O || 16.34 || 3.0 km || multiple || 2004–2022 || 05 Jan 2022 || 174 || align=left | Disc.: LINEAR || 
|- id="2004 RJ64" bgcolor=#fefefe
| – ||  || MBA-I || 17.7 || data-sort-value="0.86" | 860 m || single || 37 days || 18 Sep 2004 || 19 || align=left | Disc.: LINEAR || 
|- id="2004 RS64" bgcolor=#d6d6d6
| 0 ||  || MBA-O || 16.77 || 2.5 km || multiple || 1999–2022 || 24 Jan 2022 || 130 || align=left | Disc.: LINEARAlt.: 2014 KA89 || 
|- id="2004 RN67" bgcolor=#fefefe
| 0 ||  || MBA-I || 18.0 || data-sort-value="0.75" | 750 m || multiple || 2004–2020 || 21 Apr 2020 || 59 || align=left | Disc.: LINEAR || 
|- id="2004 RO68" bgcolor=#E9E9E9
| 0 ||  || MBA-M || 17.90 || data-sort-value="0.78" | 780 m || multiple || 2004–2021 || 27 Nov 2021 || 106 || align=left | Disc.: LINEAR || 
|- id="2004 RW68" bgcolor=#E9E9E9
| – ||  || MBA-M || 18.3 || data-sort-value="0.65" | 650 m || single || 5 days || 13 Sep 2004 || 18 || align=left | Disc.: LINEAR || 
|- id="2004 RQ69" bgcolor=#E9E9E9
| 0 ||  || MBA-M || 17.79 || 1.2 km || multiple || 2004–2021 || 28 Nov 2021 || 105 || align=left | Disc.: LINEARAlt.: 2017 SG150 || 
|- id="2004 RZ69" bgcolor=#E9E9E9
| 0 ||  || MBA-M || 18.07 || 1.0 km || multiple || 2004–2021 || 09 Dec 2021 || 104 || align=left | Disc.: LINEARAlt.: 2013 WC17 || 
|- id="2004 RA70" bgcolor=#FFE699
| 9 ||  || Asteroid || 19.05 || data-sort-value="0.9" | 900 m || single || 1 day || 09 Sep 2004 || 12 || align=left | Disc.: LINEARAdded on 21 August 2021MCA at MPC || 
|- id="2004 RX70" bgcolor=#fefefe
| 0 ||  || MBA-I || 18.40 || data-sort-value="0.62" | 620 m || multiple || 2000–2021 || 15 Apr 2021 || 65 || align=left | Disc.: LINEAR || 
|- id="2004 RC71" bgcolor=#fefefe
| – ||  || MBA-I || 18.8 || data-sort-value="0.52" | 520 m || single || 15 days || 23 Sep 2004 || 10 || align=left | Disc.: LINEAR || 
|- id="2004 RM71" bgcolor=#E9E9E9
| 0 ||  || MBA-M || 18.16 || data-sort-value="0.98" | 980 m || multiple || 2004–2021 || 09 Nov 2021 || 121 || align=left | Disc.: LINEAR || 
|- id="2004 RC72" bgcolor=#d6d6d6
| 0 ||  || MBA-O || 17.2 || 2.0 km || multiple || 2004–2020 || 15 Dec 2020 || 155 || align=left | Disc.: LINEAR || 
|- id="2004 RW72" bgcolor=#E9E9E9
| 0 ||  || MBA-M || 17.73 || 1.2 km || multiple || 2004–2021 || 30 Oct 2021 || 136 || align=left | Disc.: LINEAR || 
|- id="2004 RO73" bgcolor=#fefefe
| 0 ||  || MBA-I || 18.51 || data-sort-value="0.59" | 590 m || multiple || 2004–2021 || 15 Apr 2021 || 46 || align=left | Disc.: LINEARAlt.: 2007 JL34 || 
|- id="2004 RO75" bgcolor=#E9E9E9
| 0 ||  || MBA-M || 17.67 || 1.2 km || multiple || 2004–2021 || 03 Dec 2021 || 185 || align=left | Disc.: LINEAR || 
|- id="2004 RP77" bgcolor=#FA8072
| 4 ||  || MCA || 17.9 || data-sort-value="0.78" | 780 m || single || 69 days || 20 Oct 2004 || 34 || align=left | Disc.: LINEAR || 
|- id="2004 RZ79" bgcolor=#FA8072
| 0 ||  || MCA || 18.47 || data-sort-value="0.60" | 600 m || multiple || 2004–2022 || 07 Jan 2022 || 341 || align=left | Disc.: LINEAR || 
|- id="2004 RC80" bgcolor=#FFC2E0
| 7 ||  || AMO || 24.4 || data-sort-value="0.047" | 47 m || single || 10 days || 18 Sep 2004 || 54 || align=left | Disc.: LINEAR || 
|- id="2004 RM80" bgcolor=#fefefe
| 1 ||  || MBA-I || 18.1 || data-sort-value="0.71" | 710 m || multiple || 2004–2019 || 15 Nov 2019 || 86 || align=left | Disc.: LINEARAlt.: 2008 VG61 || 
|- id="2004 RQ80" bgcolor=#fefefe
| 1 ||  || MBA-I || 18.2 || data-sort-value="0.68" | 680 m || multiple || 1960–2019 || 02 Dec 2019 || 102 || align=left | Disc.: Palomar Obs.Alt.: 1960 SU || 
|- id="2004 RF81" bgcolor=#fefefe
| 0 ||  || MBA-I || 18.1 || data-sort-value="0.71" | 710 m || multiple || 2004–2018 || 17 Jun 2018 || 67 || align=left | Disc.: LINEAR || 
|- id="2004 RW82" bgcolor=#E9E9E9
| 0 ||  || MBA-M || 17.72 || 1.2 km || multiple || 2004–2021 || 02 Oct 2021 || 92 || align=left | Disc.: LINEARAlt.: 2016 EO294 || 
|- id="2004 RX82" bgcolor=#fefefe
| 0 ||  || MBA-I || 18.1 || data-sort-value="0.71" | 710 m || multiple || 2000–2021 || 12 Jan 2021 || 93 || align=left | Disc.: LINEAR || 
|- id="2004 RA83" bgcolor=#E9E9E9
| 0 ||  || MBA-M || 17.83 || 1.1 km || multiple || 2004–2021 || 08 Sep 2021 || 143 || align=left | Disc.: LINEARAlt.: 2017 UZ13 || 
|- id="2004 RG83" bgcolor=#d6d6d6
| 0 ||  || MBA-O || 16.57 || 2.7 km || multiple || 2004–2021 || 31 Oct 2021 || 221 || align=left | Disc.: LINEARAlt.: 2010 OM23, 2015 MB57 || 
|- id="2004 RK83" bgcolor=#E9E9E9
| 0 ||  || MBA-M || 17.74 || 1.2 km || multiple || 2004–2021 || 10 Jul 2021 || 73 || align=left | Disc.: LINEAR || 
|- id="2004 RX83" bgcolor=#FA8072
| – ||  || MCA || 19.3 || data-sort-value="0.41" | 410 m || single || 31 days || 08 Oct 2004 || 32 || align=left | Disc.: NEAT || 
|- id="2004 RE84" bgcolor=#FFC2E0
| 1 ||  || APO || 21.9 || data-sort-value="0.15" | 150 m || multiple || 2004–2020 || 27 Apr 2020 || 205 || align=left | Disc.: LINEARPotentially hazardous object || 
|- id="2004 RF84" bgcolor=#FFC2E0
| 0 ||  || APO || 18.4 || data-sort-value="0.74" | 740 m || multiple || 2004–2020 || 20 Nov 2020 || 436 || align=left | Disc.: LINEARPotentially hazardous object || 
|- id="2004 RG84" bgcolor=#FA8072
| 1 ||  || HUN || 19.4 || data-sort-value="0.39" | 390 m || multiple || 2004–2019 || 01 Nov 2019 || 164 || align=left | Disc.: LINEARAlt.: 2009 SH16 || 
|- id="2004 RH84" bgcolor=#FA8072
| 1 ||  || MCA || 19.3 || data-sort-value="0.41" | 410 m || multiple || 2004–2017 || 16 Dec 2017 || 208 || align=left | Disc.: LINEAR || 
|- id="2004 RS84" bgcolor=#fefefe
| 0 ||  || HUN || 18.27 || data-sort-value="0.66" | 660 m || multiple || 2004–2021 || 12 Nov 2021 || 116 || align=left | Disc.: NEAT || 
|- id="2004 RU84" bgcolor=#FA8072
| 0 ||  || HUN || 18.84 || data-sort-value="0.51" | 510 m || multiple || 2004–2021 || 31 Mar 2021 || 100 || align=left | Disc.: LINEARAlt.: 2011 GS65 || 
|- id="2004 RA85" bgcolor=#E9E9E9
| 0 ||  || MBA-M || 18.24 || data-sort-value="0.95" | 950 m || multiple || 2000–2021 || 08 Nov 2021 || 66 || align=left | Disc.: LINEARAlt.: 2012 HF109 || 
|- id="2004 RB85" bgcolor=#FA8072
| 1 ||  || MCA || 17.6 || data-sort-value="0.90" | 900 m || multiple || 2004–2020 || 02 Apr 2020 || 89 || align=left | Disc.: LINEAR || 
|- id="2004 RD85" bgcolor=#E9E9E9
| 0 ||  || MBA-M || 17.74 || 1.6 km || multiple || 2004–2021 || 08 May 2021 || 57 || align=left | Disc.: St. Veran Obs. || 
|- id="2004 RE85" bgcolor=#d6d6d6
| 0 ||  || MBA-O || 16.3 || 3.1 km || multiple || 2004–2020 || 24 Jan 2020 || 115 || align=left | Disc.: Berg. Gladbach || 
|- id="2004 RJ85" bgcolor=#fefefe
| 0 ||  || MBA-I || 18.1 || data-sort-value="0.71" | 710 m || multiple || 1993–2020 || 24 Jan 2020 || 137 || align=left | Disc.: Berg. GladbachAlt.: 2011 PN5 || 
|- id="2004 RK85" bgcolor=#E9E9E9
| 1 ||  || MBA-M || 18.2 || data-sort-value="0.68" | 680 m || multiple || 2004–2020 || 15 Aug 2020 || 82 || align=left | Disc.: Berg. Gladbach || 
|- id="2004 RP85" bgcolor=#d6d6d6
| 0 ||  || MBA-O || 17.0 || 2.2 km || multiple || 2004–2021 || 18 Jan 2021 || 103 || align=left | Disc.: SpacewatchAlt.: 2009 SZ311, 2014 SC317, 2016 AZ57 || 
|- id="2004 RR85" bgcolor=#fefefe
| 1 ||  || MBA-I || 18.3 || data-sort-value="0.65" | 650 m || multiple || 2003–2019 || 03 Jan 2019 || 174 || align=left | Disc.: NEATAlt.: 2011 SL7 || 
|- id="2004 RY85" bgcolor=#fefefe
| 0 ||  || MBA-I || 18.2 || data-sort-value="0.68" | 680 m || multiple || 2004–2019 || 20 Dec 2019 || 79 || align=left | Disc.: SSS || 
|- id="2004 RJ86" bgcolor=#d6d6d6
| 0 ||  || MBA-O || 17.4 || 1.8 km || multiple || 2004–2020 || 30 Jan 2020 || 86 || align=left | Disc.: LINEARAlt.: 2014 VM11 || 
|- id="2004 RR86" bgcolor=#d6d6d6
| 0 ||  || MBA-O || 17.12 || 2.1 km || multiple || 2004–2021 || 03 Nov 2021 || 35 || align=left | Disc.: LINEAR || 
|- id="2004 RD87" bgcolor=#FA8072
| 0 ||  || MCA || 18.58 || data-sort-value="0.57" | 570 m || multiple || 2004–2022 || 07 Jan 2022 || 127 || align=left | Disc.: NEATAlt.: 2014 RC25 || 
|- id="2004 RV87" bgcolor=#fefefe
| 1 ||  || MBA-I || 18.2 || data-sort-value="0.68" | 680 m || multiple || 2004–2020 || 12 Dec 2020 || 134 || align=left | Disc.: NEAT || 
|- id="2004 RW87" bgcolor=#E9E9E9
| 0 ||  || MBA-M || 17.4 || 1.4 km || multiple || 2000–2019 || 08 Feb 2019 || 96 || align=left | Disc.: NEAT || 
|- id="2004 RD88" bgcolor=#fefefe
| 0 ||  || MBA-I || 19.25 || data-sort-value="0.42" | 420 m || multiple || 2004–2022 || 25 Jan 2022 || 35 || align=left | Disc.: Spacewatch || 
|- id="2004 RH88" bgcolor=#fefefe
| 0 ||  || MBA-I || 17.30 || 1.0 km || multiple || 2004–2021 || 09 May 2021 || 193 || align=left | Disc.: NEAT || 
|- id="2004 RQ90" bgcolor=#fefefe
| 0 ||  || MBA-I || 17.99 || data-sort-value="0.75" | 750 m || multiple || 2004–2021 || 12 Jun 2021 || 67 || align=left | Disc.: LINEAR || 
|- id="2004 RO91" bgcolor=#E9E9E9
| 0 ||  || MBA-M || 18.31 || data-sort-value="0.92" | 920 m || multiple || 2004–2021 || 27 Sep 2021 || 89 || align=left | Disc.: LINEARAlt.: 2017 RE112 || 
|- id="2004 RJ92" bgcolor=#d6d6d6
| 0 ||  || MBA-O || 17.31 || 1.9 km || multiple || 2004–2022 || 26 Jan 2022 || 126 || align=left | Disc.: LINEARAlt.: 2015 TV310 || 
|- id="2004 RO93" bgcolor=#FA8072
| 0 ||  || MCA || 18.1 || data-sort-value="0.71" | 710 m || multiple || 2004–2019 || 26 Nov 2019 || 152 || align=left | Disc.: LINEAR || 
|- id="2004 RJ94" bgcolor=#E9E9E9
| 0 ||  || MBA-M || 17.96 || 1.1 km || multiple || 2004–2021 || 30 Jun 2021 || 51 || align=left | Disc.: LINEAR || 
|- id="2004 RR96" bgcolor=#E9E9E9
| 1 ||  || MBA-M || 17.3 || 1.0 km || multiple || 2004–2020 || 10 Sep 2020 || 76 || align=left | Disc.: NEATAlt.: 2016 PB18 || 
|- id="2004 RJ97" bgcolor=#E9E9E9
| 0 ||  || MBA-M || 17.50 || 1.3 km || multiple || 1999–2021 || 27 Nov 2021 || 212 || align=left | Disc.: NEATAlt.: 2016 HG6 || 
|- id="2004 RM97" bgcolor=#E9E9E9
| – ||  || MBA-M || 17.4 || data-sort-value="0.98" | 980 m || single || 37 days || 18 Sep 2004 || 26 || align=left | Disc.: LINEAR || 
|- id="2004 RS97" bgcolor=#d6d6d6
| 1 ||  || MBA-O || 17.8 || 1.5 km || multiple || 1999–2019 || 24 Oct 2019 || 108 || align=left | Disc.: LINEARAlt.: 2014 RX28 || 
|- id="2004 RC98" bgcolor=#fefefe
| 0 ||  || MBA-I || 18.2 || data-sort-value="0.68" | 680 m || multiple || 2004–2021 || 05 Jan 2021 || 160 || align=left | Disc.: LINEAR || 
|- id="2004 RE98" bgcolor=#fefefe
| 0 ||  || MBA-I || 18.30 || data-sort-value="0.65" | 650 m || multiple || 2004–2021 || 03 May 2021 || 66 || align=left | Disc.: LINEAR || 
|- id="2004 RK98" bgcolor=#E9E9E9
| 0 ||  || MBA-M || 18.21 || data-sort-value="0.96" | 960 m || multiple || 2004–2021 || 09 Nov 2021 || 134 || align=left | Disc.: LINEAR || 
|- id="2004 RQ98" bgcolor=#fefefe
| 1 ||  || MBA-I || 17.4 || data-sort-value="0.98" | 980 m || multiple || 2004–2020 || 24 Jan 2020 || 131 || align=left | Disc.: LINEARAlt.: 2011 QX33 || 
|- id="2004 RV98" bgcolor=#E9E9E9
| 1 ||  || MBA-M || 17.4 || 1.4 km || multiple || 2004–2019 || 08 Jan 2019 || 63 || align=left | Disc.: LINEAR || 
|- id="2004 RX102" bgcolor=#E9E9E9
| 0 ||  || MBA-M || 17.69 || data-sort-value="0.86" | 860 m || multiple || 2004–2021 || 09 Nov 2021 || 64 || align=left | Disc.: LINEARAlt.: 2021 QE26 || 
|- id="2004 RZ102" bgcolor=#E9E9E9
| 0 ||  || MBA-M || 18.11 || 1.0 km || multiple || 2004–2021 || 25 Nov 2021 || 92 || align=left | Disc.: LINEAR || 
|- id="2004 RG103" bgcolor=#d6d6d6
| 0 ||  || MBA-O || 16.8 || 2.4 km || multiple || 2004–2021 || 11 Jan 2021 || 101 || align=left | Disc.: NEATAlt.: 2009 QK25 || 
|- id="2004 RL103" bgcolor=#FA8072
| 4 ||  || MCA || 19.4 || data-sort-value="0.39" | 390 m || multiple || 2004–2017 || 25 Oct 2017 || 34 || align=left | Disc.: LINEAR || 
|- id="2004 RS104" bgcolor=#fefefe
| 0 ||  || MBA-I || 17.9 || data-sort-value="0.78" | 780 m || multiple || 2004–2020 || 27 Feb 2020 || 105 || align=left | Disc.: NEAT || 
|- id="2004 RL106" bgcolor=#E9E9E9
| 0 ||  || MBA-M || 17.11 || 1.6 km || multiple || 2004–2021 || 20 Nov 2021 || 206 || align=left | Disc.: NEAT || 
|- id="2004 RB107" bgcolor=#E9E9E9
| 0 ||  || MBA-M || 17.42 || 1.8 km || multiple || 2004–2021 || 12 May 2021 || 94 || align=left | Disc.: Apache PointAlt.: 2009 WD119 || 
|- id="2004 RK107" bgcolor=#E9E9E9
| 0 ||  || MBA-M || 18.05 || 1.0 km || multiple || 2002–2021 || 09 Nov 2021 || 91 || align=left | Disc.: LINEARAlt.: 2006 CL74 || 
|- id="2004 RO107" bgcolor=#fefefe
| 1 ||  || MBA-I || 18.0 || data-sort-value="0.75" | 750 m || multiple || 2004–2019 || 25 Nov 2019 || 99 || align=left | Disc.: LINEARAlt.: 2008 UB197 || 
|- id="2004 RX108" bgcolor=#fefefe
| 0 ||  || MBA-I || 18.6 || data-sort-value="0.57" | 570 m || multiple || 2004–2020 || 10 Nov 2020 || 92 || align=left | Disc.: Spacewatch || 
|- id="2004 RZ108" bgcolor=#E9E9E9
| 0 ||  || MBA-M || 18.47 || data-sort-value="0.85" | 850 m || multiple || 2004–2021 || 31 Oct 2021 || 82 || align=left | Disc.: SpacewatchAlt.: 2021 PS21 || 
|- id="2004 RJ109" bgcolor=#E9E9E9
| 0 ||  || MBA-M || 18.24 || data-sort-value="0.67" | 670 m || multiple || 2000–2021 || 30 Nov 2021 || 88 || align=left | Disc.: LINEAR || 
|- id="2004 RO109" bgcolor=#fefefe
| – ||  || HUN || 20.0 || data-sort-value="0.30" | 300 m || single || 6 days || 13 Sep 2004 || 9 || align=left | Disc.: Spacewatch || 
|- id="2004 RQ109" bgcolor=#FFC2E0
| 4 ||  || AMO || 20.6 || data-sort-value="0.27" | 270 m || single || 75 days || 23 Nov 2004 || 43 || align=left | Disc.: LINEAR || 
|- id="2004 RR109" bgcolor=#FFE699
| 2 ||  || Asteroid || 17.4 || 1.8 km || multiple || 2004–2016 || 22 Sep 2016 || 97 || align=left | Disc.: SpacewatchMCA at MPC || 
|- id="2004 RS109" bgcolor=#FFC2E0
| 1 ||  || AMO || 18.9 || data-sort-value="0.59" | 590 m || multiple || 2004–2018 || 11 Aug 2018 || 308 || align=left | Disc.: Črni Vrh Obs. || 
|- id="2004 RT109" bgcolor=#FFE699
| 1 ||  || Asteroid || 18.7 || 1.0 km || multiple || 2004–2018 || 10 Oct 2018 || 216 || align=left | Disc.: KLENOTMCA at MPC || 
|- id="2004 RU109" bgcolor=#FFC2E0
| 6 ||  || APO || 26.4 || data-sort-value="0.019" | 19 m || single || 2 days || 12 Sep 2004 || 50 || align=left | Disc.: LINEAR || 
|- id="2004 RV109" bgcolor=#FA8072
| 0 ||  || MCA || 17.39 || 1.9 km || multiple || 2004–2021 || 11 Nov 2021 || 150 || align=left | Disc.: LINEARAlt.: 2009 FZ54 || 
|- id="2004 RY109" bgcolor=#FFC2E0
| 1 ||  || APO || 19.0 || data-sort-value="0.56" | 560 m || multiple || 2004–2020 || 28 Jan 2020 || 147 || align=left | Disc.: LINEARPotentially hazardous object || 
|- id="2004 RD110" bgcolor=#E9E9E9
| 2 ||  || MBA-M || 17.2 || 1.1 km || multiple || 2004–2021 || 26 Nov 2021 || 40 || align=left | Disc.: LONEOS || 
|- id="2004 RX110" bgcolor=#E9E9E9
| 1 ||  || MBA-M || 17.4 || 2.4 km || multiple || 2004–2020 || 25 Jan 2020 || 139 || align=left | Disc.: Goodricke-Pigott Obs. || 
|- id="2004 RG111" bgcolor=#d6d6d6
| 0 ||  || MBA-O || 17.64 || 1.7 km || multiple || 2004–2022 || 07 Jan 2022 || 72 || align=left | Disc.: Spacewatch || 
|- id="2004 RJ111" bgcolor=#d6d6d6
| 1 ||  || MBA-O || 17.3 || 1.9 km || multiple || 2004–2020 || 17 Dec 2020 || 78 || align=left | Disc.: LINEAR || 
|- id="2004 RN111" bgcolor=#FFC2E0
| 7 ||  || APO || 25.0 || data-sort-value="0.036" | 36 m || single || 6 days || 17 Sep 2004 || 46 || align=left | Disc.: LINEARAMO at MPC || 
|- id="2004 RO111" bgcolor=#FFC2E0
| 2 ||  || ATE || 23.3 || data-sort-value="0.078" | 78 m || multiple || 2004–2020 || 10 Sep 2020 || 69 || align=left | Disc.: LINEAR || 
|- id="2004 RP111" bgcolor=#FFE699
| 0 ||  || Asteroid || 18.21 || 1.3 km || multiple || 2004–2022 || 25 Jan 2022 || 99 || align=left | Disc.: LINEARMCA at MPC || 
|- id="2004 RC112" bgcolor=#E9E9E9
| 0 ||  || MBA-M || 17.2 || 2.0 km || multiple || 2004–2018 || 09 Nov 2018 || 81 || align=left | Disc.: George Obs.Alt.: 2004 RQ344 || 
|- id="2004 RP113" bgcolor=#E9E9E9
| 0 ||  || MBA-M || 16.29 || 2.3 km || multiple || 2004–2021 || 02 Jun 2021 || 103 || align=left | Disc.: NEATAlt.: 2016 AM163 || 
|- id="2004 RW113" bgcolor=#fefefe
| 0 ||  || MBA-I || 17.73 || data-sort-value="0.85" | 850 m || multiple || 2004–2021 || 12 May 2021 || 71 || align=left | Disc.: NEATAlt.: 2011 ML1 || 
|- id="2004 RB114" bgcolor=#E9E9E9
| 4 ||  || MBA-M || 17.7 || 1.6 km || multiple || 2004–2015 || 22 Jan 2015 || 22 || align=left | Disc.: NEATAlt.: 2015 BY486 || 
|- id="2004 RD115" bgcolor=#fefefe
| 0 ||  || MBA-I || 18.0 || data-sort-value="0.75" | 750 m || multiple || 2004–2019 || 25 Sep 2019 || 85 || align=left | Disc.: SpacewatchAlt.: 2008 TC55 || 
|- id="2004 RO115" bgcolor=#E9E9E9
| 0 ||  || MBA-M || 17.6 || 1.3 km || multiple || 2004–2020 || 16 May 2020 || 46 || align=left | Disc.: Spacewatch || 
|- id="2004 RR115" bgcolor=#d6d6d6
| 0 ||  || MBA-O || 17.2 || 2.0 km || multiple || 2004–2020 || 16 Oct 2020 || 38 || align=left | Disc.: Spacewatch || 
|- id="2004 RD116" bgcolor=#E9E9E9
| 0 ||  || MBA-M || 17.71 || 1.6 km || multiple || 2004–2021 || 07 Apr 2021 || 52 || align=left | Disc.: SpacewatchAlt.: 2005 YZ248, 2009 UE75 || 
|- id="2004 RP116" bgcolor=#d6d6d6
| 0 ||  || MBA-O || 17.19 || 2.0 km || multiple || 2003–2021 || 03 Oct 2021 || 96 || align=left | Disc.: SpacewatchAlt.: 2016 UU83 || 
|- id="2004 RQ116" bgcolor=#fefefe
| 1 ||  || MBA-I || 19.85 || data-sort-value="0.32" | 320 m || multiple || 2004–2021 || 29 Nov 2021 || 33 || align=left | Disc.: Spacewatch || 
|- id="2004 RS116" bgcolor=#d6d6d6
| 1 ||  || MBA-O || 17.20 || 2.0 km || multiple || 2004–2021 || 30 Oct 2021 || 89 || align=left | Disc.: SpacewatchAdded on 21 August 2021Alt.: 2010 NN69 || 
|- id="2004 RC117" bgcolor=#d6d6d6
| 0 ||  || MBA-O || 17.3 || 1.9 km || multiple || 2004–2019 || 26 Sep 2019 || 58 || align=left | Disc.: SpacewatchAlt.: 2009 SC309, 2014 SJ12 || 
|- id="2004 RD117" bgcolor=#fefefe
| 0 ||  || MBA-I || 18.3 || data-sort-value="0.65" | 650 m || multiple || 2004–2019 || 21 Sep 2019 || 122 || align=left | Disc.: Spacewatch || 
|- id="2004 RF117" bgcolor=#fefefe
| 0 ||  || MBA-I || 19.3 || data-sort-value="0.41" | 410 m || multiple || 2004–2019 || 29 Sep 2019 || 34 || align=left | Disc.: Spacewatch || 
|- id="2004 RG117" bgcolor=#d6d6d6
| 0 ||  || MBA-O || 16.7 || 2.5 km || multiple || 1999–2021 || 09 Jan 2021 || 136 || align=left | Disc.: SpacewatchAlt.: 2014 RE28, 2015 XJ382 || 
|- id="2004 RK117" bgcolor=#fefefe
| 0 ||  || MBA-I || 18.39 || data-sort-value="0.62" | 620 m || multiple || 2004–2021 || 08 Sep 2021 || 59 || align=left | Disc.: Spacewatch || 
|- id="2004 RL117" bgcolor=#fefefe
| 0 ||  || MBA-I || 18.95 || data-sort-value="0.48" | 480 m || multiple || 2004–2021 || 11 May 2021 || 47 || align=left | Disc.: SpacewatchAlt.: 2014 HP140 || 
|- id="2004 RP117" bgcolor=#E9E9E9
| 0 ||  || MBA-M || 18.41 || data-sort-value="0.82" | 840 m || multiple || 2004–2023 || 11 Feb 2023 || 56 || align=left | Disc.: SpacewatchAdded on 5 November 2021Alt.: 2017 UE51 || 
|- id="2004 RQ117" bgcolor=#E9E9E9
| 0 ||  || MBA-M || 17.3 || 1.5 km || multiple || 2004–2020 || 19 Apr 2020 || 74 || align=left | Disc.: SpacewatchAlt.: 2015 BQ171, 2017 OM3 || 
|- id="2004 RU117" bgcolor=#E9E9E9
| 0 ||  || MBA-M || 17.4 || 1.8 km || multiple || 2004–2021 || 08 Jun 2021 || 55 || align=left | Disc.: Spacewatch || 
|- id="2004 RX117" bgcolor=#E9E9E9
| 0 ||  || MBA-M || 17.3 || 1.5 km || multiple || 2004–2020 || 16 May 2020 || 70 || align=left | Disc.: Spacewatch || 
|- id="2004 RF118" bgcolor=#d6d6d6
| 0 ||  || MBA-O || 17.6 || 1.7 km || multiple || 2004–2020 || 08 Nov 2020 || 41 || align=left | Disc.: Spacewatch || 
|- id="2004 RG118" bgcolor=#E9E9E9
| 0 ||  || MBA-M || 18.53 || data-sort-value="0.58" | 580 m || multiple || 2004–2021 || 09 Nov 2021 || 41 || align=left | Disc.: SpacewatchAdded on 21 August 2021 || 
|- id="2004 RL118" bgcolor=#d6d6d6
| 0 ||  || MBA-O || 16.39 || 2.9 km || multiple || 1996–2021 || 26 Oct 2021 || 135 || align=left | Disc.: SpacewatchAlt.: 2015 PJ147, 2017 UV50 || 
|- id="2004 RN118" bgcolor=#E9E9E9
| 0 ||  || MBA-M || 17.32 || 1.9 km || multiple || 1995–2021 || 03 May 2021 || 83 || align=left | Disc.: Spacewatch || 
|- id="2004 RA119" bgcolor=#d6d6d6
| 0 ||  || MBA-O || 16.14 || 3.3 km || multiple || 2004–2021 || 24 Nov 2021 || 168 || align=left | Disc.: NEATAlt.: 2007 HO13, 2010 OM67 || 
|- id="2004 RC119" bgcolor=#E9E9E9
| 6 ||  || MBA-M || 17.3 || 1.5 km || multiple || 2004–2013 || 28 Nov 2013 || 15 || align=left | Disc.: SpacewatchAlt.: 2013 WS12 || 
|- id="2004 RO119" bgcolor=#fefefe
| 0 ||  || MBA-I || 18.73 || data-sort-value="0.53" | 530 m || multiple || 2004–2021 || 11 May 2021 || 56 || align=left | Disc.: Spacewatch || 
|- id="2004 RT119" bgcolor=#d6d6d6
| 0 ||  || MBA-O || 17.10 || 2.1 km || multiple || 2004–2021 || 03 May 2021 || 136 || align=left | Disc.: SpacewatchAlt.: 2009 SH206, 2014 UV203, 2016 CJ214 || 
|- id="2004 RV119" bgcolor=#E9E9E9
| 0 ||  || MBA-M || 17.8 || 1.2 km || multiple || 2004–2019 || 03 Jan 2019 || 21 || align=left | Disc.: SpacewatchAdded on 21 August 2021 || 
|- id="2004 RE120" bgcolor=#E9E9E9
| 1 ||  || MBA-M || 18.1 || data-sort-value="0.71" | 710 m || multiple || 2004–2020 || 29 Jun 2020 || 36 || align=left | Disc.: SpacewatchAlt.: 2015 EQ29 || 
|- id="2004 RK120" bgcolor=#E9E9E9
| 0 ||  || MBA-M || 17.8 || 1.5 km || multiple || 1995–2018 || 17 Aug 2018 || 31 || align=left | Disc.: Spacewatch || 
|- id="2004 RV120" bgcolor=#d6d6d6
| 3 ||  || MBA-O || 17.0 || 2.2 km || multiple || 2004–2015 || 09 Nov 2015 || 18 || align=left | Disc.: SpacewatchAdded on 21 August 2021 || 
|- id="2004 RY120" bgcolor=#d6d6d6
| 2 ||  || MBA-O || 17.6 || 1.7 km || multiple || 2004–2020 || 11 Dec 2020 || 70 || align=left | Disc.: SpacewatchAlt.: 2015 XH211 || 
|- id="2004 RK121" bgcolor=#fefefe
| 0 ||  || MBA-I || 18.41 || data-sort-value="0.62" | 620 m || multiple || 2004–2021 || 15 Apr 2021 || 81 || align=left | Disc.: Spacewatch || 
|- id="2004 RL121" bgcolor=#E9E9E9
| 0 ||  || MBA-M || 17.74 || data-sort-value="0.84" | 840 m || multiple || 1998–2021 || 27 Nov 2021 || 108 || align=left | Disc.: Spacewatch || 
|- id="2004 RY121" bgcolor=#E9E9E9
| 1 ||  || MBA-M || 18.38 || data-sort-value="0.63" | 630 m || multiple || 2000–2020 || 22 Aug 2020 || 48 || align=left | Disc.: SpacewatchAdded on 21 August 2021 || 
|- id="2004 RB122" bgcolor=#fefefe
| 0 ||  || MBA-I || 18.65 || data-sort-value="0.55" | 550 m || multiple || 2004–2021 || 09 Jun 2021 || 64 || align=left | Disc.: SpacewatchAdded on 17 June 2021 || 
|- id="2004 RC122" bgcolor=#fefefe
| 0 ||  || MBA-I || 17.9 || data-sort-value="0.78" | 780 m || multiple || 2004–2020 || 23 Nov 2020 || 105 || align=left | Disc.: SpacewatchAlt.: 2015 HQ91 || 
|- id="2004 RD122" bgcolor=#d6d6d6
| 0 ||  || MBA-O || 16.78 || 2.5 km || multiple || 2004–2021 || 25 Nov 2021 || 94 || align=left | Disc.: Spacewatch || 
|- id="2004 RF122" bgcolor=#E9E9E9
| 0 ||  || MBA-M || 17.69 || 1.2 km || multiple || 2004–2021 || 23 Nov 2021 || 110 || align=left | Disc.: Spacewatch || 
|- id="2004 RG122" bgcolor=#E9E9E9
| 4 ||  || MBA-M || 18.5 || data-sort-value="0.59" | 590 m || multiple || 2004–2021 || 02 Dec 2021 || 18 || align=left | Disc.: SpacewatchAdded on 24 December 2021 || 
|- id="2004 RR122" bgcolor=#fefefe
| 1 ||  || MBA-I || 19.0 || data-sort-value="0.47" | 470 m || multiple || 2004–2020 || 24 Jan 2020 || 34 || align=left | Disc.: SpacewatchAlt.: 2015 RS220 || 
|- id="2004 RU123" bgcolor=#E9E9E9
| 0 ||  || MBA-M || 16.3 || 2.3 km || multiple || 2004–2021 || 17 Jul 2021 || 145 || align=left | Disc.: NEATAlt.: 2009 VM102, 2014 YL91 || 
|- id="2004 RB124" bgcolor=#E9E9E9
| 1 ||  || MBA-M || 16.8 || 2.4 km || multiple || 2004–2020 || 21 Mar 2020 || 78 || align=left | Disc.: NEATAlt.: 2013 PH25 || 
|- id="2004 RR124" bgcolor=#fefefe
| 0 ||  || MBA-I || 18.0 || data-sort-value="0.75" | 750 m || multiple || 2004–2021 || 09 Jan 2021 || 52 || align=left | Disc.: SpacewatchAlt.: 2008 SR35 || 
|- id="2004 RT124" bgcolor=#E9E9E9
| 0 ||  || MBA-M || 18.2 || data-sort-value="0.68" | 680 m || multiple || 2004–2021 || 30 Nov 2021 || 40 || align=left | Disc.: SpacewatchAdded on 29 January 2022 || 
|- id="2004 RX124" bgcolor=#d6d6d6
| 0 ||  || MBA-O || 16.71 || 2.5 km || multiple || 2001–2021 || 03 Dec 2021 || 109 || align=left | Disc.: Spacewatch || 
|- id="2004 RA125" bgcolor=#E9E9E9
| 2 ||  || MBA-M || 17.7 || 1.6 km || multiple || 2004–2018 || 12 Dec 2018 || 41 || align=left | Disc.: SpacewatchAlt.: 2013 QJ29 || 
|- id="2004 RB125" bgcolor=#fefefe
| – ||  || MBA-I || 19.1 || data-sort-value="0.45" | 450 m || single || 47 days || 11 Oct 2004 || 11 || align=left | Disc.: Spacewatch || 
|- id="2004 RD125" bgcolor=#d6d6d6
| 0 ||  || MBA-O || 17.08 || 2.1 km || multiple || 2004–2021 || 07 Nov 2021 || 75 || align=left | Disc.: SpacewatchAlt.: 2021 QJ62 || 
|- id="2004 RF125" bgcolor=#E9E9E9
| 0 ||  || MBA-M || 17.2 || 2.0 km || multiple || 2002–2020 || 02 Feb 2020 || 128 || align=left | Disc.: SpacewatchAlt.: 2011 EQ10 || 
|- id="2004 RP125" bgcolor=#fefefe
| 2 ||  || MBA-I || 19.4 || data-sort-value="0.39" | 390 m || multiple || 2004–2020 || 10 Dec 2020 || 26 || align=left | Disc.: Spacewatch || 
|- id="2004 RQ125" bgcolor=#d6d6d6
| 0 ||  || MBA-O || 16.9 || 2.3 km || multiple || 2004–2019 || 05 Nov 2019 || 87 || align=left | Disc.: Spacewatch || 
|- id="2004 RT125" bgcolor=#d6d6d6
| 0 ||  || MBA-O || 17.0 || 2.2 km || multiple || 2004–2020 || 16 Oct 2020 || 80 || align=left | Disc.: SpacewatchAdded on 17 January 2021Alt.: 2012 BL121, 2013 HA134, 2014 OG132 || 
|- id="2004 RY125" bgcolor=#fefefe
| 5 ||  || MBA-I || 19.5 || data-sort-value="0.37" | 370 m || multiple || 2004–2015 || 23 Oct 2015 || 21 || align=left | Disc.: SpacewatchAdded on 19 October 2020 || 
|- id="2004 RC126" bgcolor=#fefefe
| 2 ||  || MBA-I || 19.5 || data-sort-value="0.37" | 370 m || multiple || 2004–2018 || 11 Nov 2018 || 47 || align=left | Disc.: Spacewatch || 
|- id="2004 RE126" bgcolor=#fefefe
| 0 ||  || MBA-I || 18.0 || data-sort-value="0.75" | 750 m || multiple || 1999–2020 || 03 Jan 2020 || 78 || align=left | Disc.: SpacewatchAlt.: 2015 VO107 || 
|- id="2004 RF126" bgcolor=#E9E9E9
| 1 ||  || MBA-M || 18.91 || data-sort-value="0.69" | 690 m || multiple || 2004–2021 || 14 Jul 2021 || 31 || align=left | Disc.: Spacewatch || 
|- id="2004 RR126" bgcolor=#E9E9E9
| 2 ||  || MBA-M || 18.3 || data-sort-value="0.65" | 650 m || multiple || 2004–2020 || 23 Sep 2020 || 57 || align=left | Disc.: SpacewatchAdded on 17 January 2021 || 
|- id="2004 RV126" bgcolor=#E9E9E9
| 0 ||  || MBA-M || 17.69 || data-sort-value="0.86" | 860 m || multiple || 2004–2021 || 28 Nov 2021 || 41 || align=left | Disc.: Spacewatch || 
|- id="2004 RZ126" bgcolor=#d6d6d6
| 2 ||  || MBA-O || 17.7 || 1.6 km || multiple || 2004–2019 || 27 Oct 2019 || 32 || align=left | Disc.: Spacewatch || 
|- id="2004 RE127" bgcolor=#d6d6d6
| 0 ||  || MBA-O || 17.14 || 2.1 km || multiple || 2004–2021 || 23 Nov 2021 || 53 || align=left | Disc.: Spacewatch || 
|- id="2004 RK127" bgcolor=#E9E9E9
| – ||  || MBA-M || 18.6 || data-sort-value="0.80" | 800 m || single || 16 days || 23 Sep 2004 || 9 || align=left | Disc.: Spacewatch || 
|- id="2004 RW127" bgcolor=#E9E9E9
| 3 ||  || MBA-M || 18.91 || data-sort-value="0.69" | 690 m || multiple || 2004–2021 || 01 Oct 2021 || 27 || align=left | Disc.: SpacewatchAdded on 5 November 2021 || 
|- id="2004 RX127" bgcolor=#d6d6d6
| 0 ||  || MBA-O || 16.74 || 2.5 km || multiple || 2004–2021 || 28 Nov 2021 || 84 || align=left | Disc.: Spacewatch || 
|- id="2004 RC128" bgcolor=#E9E9E9
| 0 ||  || MBA-M || 17.64 || 1.7 km || multiple || 2004–2021 || 30 May 2021 || 78 || align=left | Disc.: Spacewatch || 
|- id="2004 RJ128" bgcolor=#E9E9E9
| 0 ||  || MBA-M || 18.1 || 1.3 km || multiple || 1995–2020 || 01 Feb 2020 || 41 || align=left | Disc.: Spacewatch || 
|- id="2004 RL128" bgcolor=#E9E9E9
| 3 ||  || MBA-M || 18.0 || data-sort-value="0.75" | 750 m || multiple || 2004–2016 || 29 Jul 2016 || 22 || align=left | Disc.: Spacewatch || 
|- id="2004 RO128" bgcolor=#fefefe
| 0 ||  || MBA-I || 18.7 || data-sort-value="0.54" | 540 m || multiple || 2004–2020 || 26 Jan 2020 || 40 || align=left | Disc.: SpacewatchAlt.: 2014 MV34 || 
|- id="2004 RT128" bgcolor=#d6d6d6
| 0 ||  || MBA-O || 17.8 || 1.5 km || multiple || 2003–2020 || 17 Oct 2020 || 48 || align=left | Disc.: SpacewatchAdded on 22 July 2020 || 
|- id="2004 RZ128" bgcolor=#E9E9E9
| 0 ||  || MBA-M || 17.52 || 1.7 km || multiple || 2004–2021 || 11 Jul 2021 || 78 || align=left | Disc.: SpacewatchAlt.: 2013 SP92 || 
|- id="2004 RF129" bgcolor=#E9E9E9
| 0 ||  || MBA-M || 18.34 || data-sort-value="0.64" | 640 m || multiple || 2000–2021 || 30 Nov 2021 || 74 || align=left | Disc.: Spacewatch || 
|- id="2004 RH129" bgcolor=#d6d6d6
| 3 ||  || HIL || 16.4 || 2.9 km || multiple || 2004–2020 || 05 Nov 2020 || 36 || align=left | Disc.: SpacewatchAlt.: 2020 RZ59 || 
|- id="2004 RP129" bgcolor=#E9E9E9
| 0 ||  || MBA-M || 17.0 || 2.2 km || multiple || 2004–2020 || 19 Apr 2020 || 164 || align=left | Disc.: SpacewatchAlt.: 2007 EZ193 || 
|- id="2004 RQ129" bgcolor=#E9E9E9
| 0 ||  || MBA-M || 18.30 || data-sort-value="0.65" | 650 m || multiple || 2004–2021 || 05 Dec 2021 || 39 || align=left | Disc.: SpacewatchAdded on 22 July 2020Alt.: 2008 QW4, 2020 JZ14 || 
|- id="2004 RU129" bgcolor=#E9E9E9
| 0 ||  || MBA-M || 17.41 || data-sort-value="0.98" | 980 m || multiple || 1994–2021 || 30 Oct 2021 || 109 || align=left | Disc.: Spacewatch || 
|- id="2004 RX129" bgcolor=#d6d6d6
| 0 ||  || MBA-O || 17.16 || 2.1 km || multiple || 2004–2021 || 06 Nov 2021 || 51 || align=left | Disc.: Spacewatch || 
|- id="2004 RD130" bgcolor=#d6d6d6
| 1 ||  || MBA-O || 17.7 || 1.6 km || multiple || 2004–2021 || 31 Oct 2021 || 33 || align=left | Disc.: SpacewatchAdded on 29 January 2022 || 
|- id="2004 RF130" bgcolor=#fefefe
| 0 ||  || MBA-I || 18.4 || data-sort-value="0.62" | 620 m || multiple || 2004–2020 || 25 Oct 2020 || 71 || align=left | Disc.: Spacewatch || 
|- id="2004 RH130" bgcolor=#E9E9E9
| 0 ||  || MBA-M || 17.58 || 1.7 km || multiple || 1995–2021 || 08 Jul 2021 || 107 || align=left | Disc.: SpacewatchAlt.: 2013 SE12 || 
|- id="2004 RN130" bgcolor=#d6d6d6
| 0 ||  || MBA-O || 16.86 || 2.4 km || multiple || 2002–2021 || 13 Oct 2021 || 74 || align=left | Disc.: Spacewatch || 
|- id="2004 RQ130" bgcolor=#fefefe
| 0 ||  || MBA-I || 18.0 || data-sort-value="0.75" | 750 m || multiple || 2004–2019 || 28 Nov 2019 || 57 || align=left | Disc.: Spacewatch || 
|- id="2004 RR130" bgcolor=#d6d6d6
| 0 ||  || MBA-O || 17.54 || 1.7 km || multiple || 2004–2021 || 23 Nov 2021 || 36 || align=left | Disc.: Spacewatch || 
|- id="2004 RT130" bgcolor=#fefefe
| 0 ||  || MBA-I || 17.95 || data-sort-value="0.76" | 760 m || multiple || 2003–2021 || 13 May 2021 || 79 || align=left | Disc.: SpacewatchAdded on 11 May 2021 || 
|- id="2004 RV130" bgcolor=#fefefe
| 0 ||  || MBA-I || 19.25 || data-sort-value="0.42" | 420 m || multiple || 2004–2021 || 08 Dec 2021 || 59 || align=left | Disc.: Spacewatch || 
|- id="2004 RA131" bgcolor=#d6d6d6
| 0 ||  || MBA-O || 16.78 || 2.5 km || multiple || 1994–2022 || 25 Jan 2022 || 162 || align=left | Disc.: SpacewatchAlt.: 1994 TR17, 2007 EJ207, 2012 CC11, 2017 CM22 || 
|- id="2004 RD131" bgcolor=#E9E9E9
| 3 ||  || MBA-M || 18.3 || 1.2 km || multiple || 2004–2018 || 05 Oct 2018 || 22 || align=left | Disc.: Spacewatch || 
|- id="2004 RG131" bgcolor=#d6d6d6
| – ||  || MBA-O || 17.8 || 1.5 km || single || 9 days || 16 Sep 2004 || 9 || align=left | Disc.: Spacewatch || 
|- id="2004 RH131" bgcolor=#fefefe
| 0 ||  || MBA-I || 18.1 || data-sort-value="0.71" | 710 m || multiple || 2004–2021 || 18 Jan 2021 || 99 || align=left | Disc.: Spacewatch || 
|- id="2004 RM131" bgcolor=#d6d6d6
| 0 ||  || MBA-O || 17.1 || 2.1 km || multiple || 1999–2020 || 22 Oct 2020 || 43 || align=left | Disc.: Spacewatch || 
|- id="2004 RP131" bgcolor=#E9E9E9
| 3 ||  || MBA-M || 18.02 || data-sort-value="0.74" | 740 m || multiple || 2004–2021 || 29 Nov 2021 || 23 || align=left | Disc.: SpacewatchAdded on 24 December 2021 || 
|- id="2004 RU131" bgcolor=#d6d6d6
| 0 ||  || MBA-O || 17.6 || 1.7 km || multiple || 2004–2020 || 21 Jan 2020 || 44 || align=left | Disc.: SpacewatchAlt.: 2014 UH145 || 
|- id="2004 RX131" bgcolor=#fefefe
| 0 ||  || MBA-I || 18.7 || data-sort-value="0.54" | 540 m || multiple || 2004–2019 || 15 Nov 2019 || 78 || align=left | Disc.: Spacewatch || 
|- id="2004 RY131" bgcolor=#fefefe
| 1 ||  || MBA-I || 19.2 || data-sort-value="0.43" | 430 m || multiple || 2004–2015 || 02 Oct 2015 || 16 || align=left | Disc.: SpacewatchAdded on 21 August 2021 || 
|- id="2004 RZ131" bgcolor=#fefefe
| – ||  || MBA-I || 19.1 || data-sort-value="0.45" | 450 m || single || 5 days || 12 Sep 2004 || 9 || align=left | Disc.: Spacewatch || 
|- id="2004 RD132" bgcolor=#E9E9E9
| 2 ||  || MBA-M || 17.97 || data-sort-value="0.76" | 760 m || multiple || 2004–2021 || 03 Dec 2021 || 41 || align=left | Disc.: Spacewatch || 
|- id="2004 RH132" bgcolor=#d6d6d6
| 0 ||  || MBA-O || 16.96 || 2.3 km || multiple || 2004–2021 || 28 Sep 2021 || 89 || align=left | Disc.: SpacewatchAdded on 13 September 2020Alt.: 2008 GL53, 2013 CP96 || 
|- id="2004 RK132" bgcolor=#E9E9E9
| 0 ||  || MBA-M || 17.8 || data-sort-value="0.82" | 820 m || multiple || 2004–2021 || 28 Nov 2021 || 26 || align=left | Disc.: SpacewatchAdded on 24 December 2021 || 
|- id="2004 RN132" bgcolor=#d6d6d6
| 0 ||  || MBA-O || 16.9 || 2.3 km || multiple || 2004–2020 || 05 Nov 2020 || 97 || align=left | Disc.: SpacewatchAlt.: 2015 TE326 || 
|- id="2004 RR132" bgcolor=#E9E9E9
| 0 ||  || MBA-M || 17.78 || 1.2 km || multiple || 1994–2021 || 01 Nov 2021 || 138 || align=left | Disc.: Spacewatch || 
|- id="2004 RW132" bgcolor=#d6d6d6
| 0 ||  || MBA-O || 16.8 || 2.4 km || multiple || 2004–2020 || 21 Jan 2020 || 96 || align=left | Disc.: Spacewatch || 
|- id="2004 RX132" bgcolor=#fefefe
| 0 ||  || MBA-I || 18.6 || data-sort-value="0.57" | 570 m || multiple || 2004–2019 || 28 Dec 2019 || 75 || align=left | Disc.: SpacewatchAlt.: 2008 VW42, 2015 RR127 || 
|- id="2004 RZ132" bgcolor=#E9E9E9
| 0 ||  || MBA-M || 18.25 || data-sort-value="0.67" | 670 m || multiple || 2000–2021 || 27 Nov 2021 || 31 || align=left | Disc.: Spacewatch || 
|- id="2004 RA133" bgcolor=#E9E9E9
| 0 ||  || MBA-M || 18.57 || data-sort-value="0.57" | 570 m || multiple || 2004–2021 || 27 Nov 2021 || 63 || align=left | Disc.: Spacewatch || 
|- id="2004 RB133" bgcolor=#d6d6d6
| 0 ||  || MBA-O || 17.7 || 1.6 km || multiple || 1999–2020 || 12 Sep 2020 || 39 || align=left | Disc.: SpacewatchAdded on 17 January 2021 || 
|- id="2004 RC133" bgcolor=#E9E9E9
| 2 ||  || MBA-M || 18.53 || data-sort-value="0.58" | 580 m || multiple || 2004–2021 || 28 Nov 2021 || 28 || align=left | Disc.: SpacewatchAdded on 24 December 2021 || 
|- id="2004 RF133" bgcolor=#fefefe
| 0 ||  || MBA-I || 18.77 || data-sort-value="0.52" | 520 m || multiple || 2004–2021 || 08 Sep 2021 || 60 || align=left | Disc.: Spacewatch || 
|- id="2004 RG133" bgcolor=#fefefe
| 0 ||  || MBA-I || 17.9 || data-sort-value="0.78" | 780 m || multiple || 2004–2021 || 15 Jun 2021 || 125 || align=left | Disc.: SpacewatchAlt.: 2011 QR15 || 
|- id="2004 RL133" bgcolor=#E9E9E9
| 0 ||  || MBA-M || 18.14 || data-sort-value="0.70" | 700 m || multiple || 2004–2022 || 06 Jan 2022 || 76 || align=left | Disc.: Spacewatch  || 
|- id="2004 RM133" bgcolor=#fefefe
| 0 ||  || MBA-I || 18.9 || data-sort-value="0.49" | 490 m || multiple || 2004–2020 || 17 Sep 2020 || 86 || align=left | Disc.: SpacewatchAlt.: 2014 WW281 || 
|- id="2004 RR133" bgcolor=#E9E9E9
| 0 ||  || MBA-M || 16.68 || 2.6 km || multiple || 2002–2021 || 20 May 2021 || 175 || align=left | Disc.: SpacewatchAlt.: 2011 BJ25, 2016 EK113 || 
|- id="2004 RT133" bgcolor=#E9E9E9
| 0 ||  || MBA-M || 17.9 || 1.1 km || multiple || 2004–2020 || 27 Apr 2020 || 69 || align=left | Disc.: SpacewatchAlt.: 2010 EE170 || 
|- id="2004 RY133" bgcolor=#E9E9E9
| – ||  || MBA-M || 19.3 || data-sort-value="0.41" | 410 m || single || 16 days || 23 Sep 2004 || 9 || align=left | Disc.: Spacewatch || 
|- id="2004 RC134" bgcolor=#d6d6d6
| 0 ||  || MBA-O || 16.9 || 2.3 km || multiple || 2004–2021 || 23 Jan 2021 || 120 || align=left | Disc.: SpacewatchAlt.: 2017 HY23 || 
|- id="2004 RE134" bgcolor=#d6d6d6
| 0 ||  || MBA-O || 16.32 || 3.0 km || multiple || 2004–2021 || 31 Oct 2021 || 125 || align=left | Disc.: SpacewatchAdded on 22 July 2020Alt.: 2010 NA87 || 
|- id="2004 RU134" bgcolor=#E9E9E9
| 0 ||  || MBA-M || 17.62 || 1.7 km || multiple || 2004–2021 || 08 May 2021 || 48 || align=left | Disc.: SpacewatchAlt.: 2009 WY150, 2013 QU53 || 
|- id="2004 RZ134" bgcolor=#d6d6d6
| 0 ||  || MBA-O || 16.70 || 2.5 km || multiple || 2004–2021 || 01 Oct 2021 || 86 || align=left | Disc.: SpacewatchAlt.: 2010 NT87, 2016 TQ69 || 
|- id="2004 RP135" bgcolor=#fefefe
| 0 ||  || MBA-I || 18.42 || data-sort-value="0.62" | 620 m || multiple || 2004–2021 || 30 Jun 2021 || 100 || align=left | Disc.: SpacewatchAlt.: 2017 CJ28 || 
|- id="2004 RY135" bgcolor=#fefefe
| 1 ||  || MBA-I || 18.9 || data-sort-value="0.49" | 490 m || multiple || 2004–2015 || 08 Nov 2015 || 24 || align=left | Disc.: SpacewatchAlt.: 2015 TM254 || 
|- id="2004 RA139" bgcolor=#d6d6d6
| 0 ||  || MBA-O || 16.6 || 2.7 km || multiple || 2004–2020 || 05 Nov 2020 || 148 || align=left | Disc.: NEATAlt.: 2020 LG3, 2020 RQ10 || 
|- id="2004 RT139" bgcolor=#d6d6d6
| 0 ||  || MBA-O || 16.52 || 3.7 km || multiple || 2004–2021 || 01 Nov 2021 || 166 || align=left | Disc.: LINEARAlt.: 2010 OM6 || 
|- id="2004 RU139" bgcolor=#FA8072
| 0 ||  || MCA || 18.84 || data-sort-value="0.51" | 510 m || multiple || 2004–2021 || 31 Oct 2021 || 93 || align=left | Disc.: LINEARAlt.: 2011 UP132 || 
|- id="2004 RP140" bgcolor=#E9E9E9
| 0 ||  || MBA-M || 17.1 || 1.6 km || multiple || 2004–2020 || 19 May 2020 || 102 || align=left | Disc.: LINEARAlt.: 2006 AJ89, 2011 GZ18 || 
|- id="2004 RX140" bgcolor=#E9E9E9
| 2 ||  || MBA-M || 17.6 || 1.7 km || multiple || 2004–2018 || 01 Nov 2018 || 48 || align=left | Disc.: LINEARAlt.: 2018 RC47 || 
|- id="2004 RG141" bgcolor=#E9E9E9
| 0 ||  || MBA-M || 16.7 || 2.5 km || multiple || 1995–2021 || 09 Jun 2021 || 130 || align=left | Disc.: LINEARAlt.: 2013 QF46 || 
|- id="2004 RH141" bgcolor=#fefefe
| – ||  || MBA-I || 17.7 || data-sort-value="0.86" | 860 m || single || 5 days || 13 Sep 2004 || 10 || align=left | Disc.: LINEAR || 
|- id="2004 RW141" bgcolor=#C7FF8F
| 0 ||  || CEN || 14.58 || 7.0 km || multiple || 2004–2021 || 08 Aug 2021 || 46 || align=left | Disc.: LINEAR || 
|- id="2004 RC142" bgcolor=#FA8072
| 0 ||  || MCA || 19.01 || data-sort-value="0.47" | 470 m || multiple || 2001–2020 || 16 Oct 2020 || 89 || align=left | Disc.: LINEAR || 
|- id="2004 RQ142" bgcolor=#fefefe
| 0 ||  || MBA-I || 19.00 || data-sort-value="0.47" | 470 m || multiple || 2004–2021 || 01 Nov 2021 || 187 || align=left | Disc.: LINEAR || 
|- id="2004 RL144" bgcolor=#d6d6d6
| 0 ||  || MBA-O || 16.7 || 2.5 km || multiple || 2004–2021 || 07 Jan 2021 || 144 || align=left | Disc.: NEATAlt.: 2014 SD266, 2016 AT134 || 
|- id="2004 RQ145" bgcolor=#d6d6d6
| 0 ||  || MBA-O || 16.90 || 2.3 km || multiple || 2004–2021 || 30 Nov 2021 || 112 || align=left | Disc.: LINEAR || 
|- id="2004 RE146" bgcolor=#E9E9E9
| 1 ||  || MBA-M || 18.35 || data-sort-value="0.64" | 640 m || multiple || 2000–2021 || 28 Nov 2021 || 68 || align=left | Disc.: LINEAR || 
|- id="2004 RH146" bgcolor=#E9E9E9
| 0 ||  || MBA-M || 17.65 || data-sort-value="0.88" | 880 m || multiple || 2002–2022 || 06 Jan 2022 || 137 || align=left | Disc.: LINEAR || 
|- id="2004 RM146" bgcolor=#d6d6d6
| 2 ||  || MBA-O || 17.2 || 2.0 km || multiple || 2002–2019 || 27 Oct 2019 || 69 || align=left | Disc.: LINEARAlt.: 2009 SO231 || 
|- id="2004 RT146" bgcolor=#E9E9E9
| 0 ||  || MBA-M || 17.1 || 1.6 km || multiple || 2002–2020 || 21 Apr 2020 || 100 || align=left | Disc.: LINEAR || 
|- id="2004 RN147" bgcolor=#FA8072
| 0 ||  || MCA || 18.4 || data-sort-value="0.62" | 620 m || multiple || 2004–2020 || 10 Dec 2020 || 57 || align=left | Disc.: LINEAR || 
|- id="2004 RR147" bgcolor=#E9E9E9
| 0 ||  || MBA-M || 17.0 || 1.7 km || multiple || 2004–2020 || 23 Mar 2020 || 67 || align=left | Disc.: LINEAR || 
|- id="2004 RE149" bgcolor=#fefefe
| 2 ||  || MBA-I || 18.4 || data-sort-value="0.62" | 620 m || multiple || 2004–2019 || 25 Nov 2019 || 68 || align=left | Disc.: LINEAR || 
|- id="2004 RL149" bgcolor=#E9E9E9
| 0 ||  || MBA-M || 18.68 || data-sort-value="0.77" | 770 m || multiple || 2002–2021 || 30 Nov 2021 || 42 || align=left | Disc.: LINEAR || 
|- id="2004 RP149" bgcolor=#E9E9E9
| 0 ||  || MBA-M || 17.73 || 1.2 km || multiple || 2000–2022 || 27 Jan 2022 || 133 || align=left | Disc.: LINEAR || 
|- id="2004 RT149" bgcolor=#E9E9E9
| 1 ||  || MBA-M || 18.28 || data-sort-value="0.93" | 930 m || multiple || 2004–2021 || 27 Nov 2021 || 76 || align=left | Disc.: LINEARAlt.: 2021 PQ71 || 
|- id="2004 RQ150" bgcolor=#fefefe
| 1 ||  || MBA-I || 18.1 || data-sort-value="0.71" | 710 m || multiple || 2004–2021 || 07 Jun 2021 || 56 || align=left | Disc.: LINEAR || 
|- id="2004 RJ151" bgcolor=#E9E9E9
| 0 ||  || MBA-M || 18.10 || data-sort-value="0.71" | 710 m || multiple || 2004–2021 || 09 Dec 2021 || 68 || align=left | Disc.: LINEARAlt.: 2008 OF13 || 
|- id="2004 RG153" bgcolor=#E9E9E9
| 0 ||  || MBA-M || 16.91 || 1.7 km || multiple || 2004–2022 || 05 Jan 2022 || 243 || align=left | Disc.: LINEARAlt.: 2013 XY6 || 
|- id="2004 RH154" bgcolor=#fefefe
| 1 ||  || MBA-I || 18.3 || data-sort-value="0.65" | 650 m || multiple || 2004–2019 || 06 Sep 2019 || 85 || align=left | Disc.: LINEAR || 
|- id="2004 RR154" bgcolor=#fefefe
| 0 ||  || MBA-I || 18.0 || data-sort-value="0.75" | 750 m || multiple || 2004–2020 || 01 Feb 2020 || 128 || align=left | Disc.: LINEAR || 
|- id="2004 RY154" bgcolor=#fefefe
| 0 ||  || MBA-I || 18.3 || data-sort-value="0.65" | 650 m || multiple || 2004–2019 || 27 Nov 2019 || 100 || align=left | Disc.: LINEARAlt.: 2008 WJ38 || 
|- id="2004 RD155" bgcolor=#fefefe
| 0 ||  || MBA-I || 18.8 || data-sort-value="0.52" | 520 m || multiple || 2003–2018 || 14 Sep 2018 || 51 || align=left | Disc.: LINEAR || 
|- id="2004 RT155" bgcolor=#E9E9E9
| 0 ||  || MBA-M || 16.2 || 3.2 km || multiple || 2000–2021 || 12 Jun 2021 || 247 || align=left | Disc.: LINEAR || 
|- id="2004 RW155" bgcolor=#d6d6d6
| 0 ||  || MBA-O || 16.90 || 2.3 km || multiple || 2004–2021 || 27 Nov 2021 || 91 || align=left | Disc.: LINEAR || 
|- id="2004 RY156" bgcolor=#E9E9E9
| 2 ||  || MBA-M || 18.30 || data-sort-value="0.65" | 650 m || multiple || 2004–2021 || 29 Nov 2021 || 55 || align=left | Disc.: LINEAR || 
|- id="2004 RR157" bgcolor=#E9E9E9
| 0 ||  || MBA-M || 17.56 || 1.3 km || multiple || 2000–2021 || 03 Dec 2021 || 189 || align=left | Disc.: LINEAR || 
|- id="2004 RN158" bgcolor=#fefefe
| 0 ||  || MBA-I || 18.3 || data-sort-value="0.65" | 650 m || multiple || 2004–2018 || 11 Jul 2018 || 66 || align=left | Disc.: LINEARAlt.: 2015 VB33 || 
|- id="2004 RC159" bgcolor=#fefefe
| 0 ||  || MBA-I || 17.78 || data-sort-value="0.83" | 830 m || multiple || 2004–2021 || 17 Apr 2021 || 86 || align=left | Disc.: LINEARAlt.: 2008 UF203 || 
|- id="2004 RJ160" bgcolor=#fefefe
| 0 ||  || MBA-I || 18.59 || data-sort-value="0.57" | 570 m || multiple || 2003–2015 || 14 Oct 2015 || 41 || align=left | Disc.: LINEARAlt.: 2011 OD14 || 
|- id="2004 RP160" bgcolor=#d6d6d6
| 0 ||  || MBA-O || 17.07 || 2.1 km || multiple || 2004–2021 || 26 Oct 2021 || 86 || align=left | Disc.: SpacewatchAdded on 24 August 2020Alt.: 2015 PB264 || 
|- id="2004 RR160" bgcolor=#E9E9E9
| 0 ||  || MBA-M || 17.7 || 1.6 km || multiple || 2004–2020 || 16 Mar 2020 || 55 || align=left | Disc.: SpacewatchAlt.: 2015 BP474 || 
|- id="2004 RC161" bgcolor=#d6d6d6
| 1 ||  || MBA-O || 17.8 || 1.5 km || multiple || 1993–2020 || 23 Aug 2020 || 38 || align=left | Disc.: SpacewatchAlt.: 2020 PA49 || 
|- id="2004 RG161" bgcolor=#E9E9E9
| 0 ||  || MBA-M || 18.37 || data-sort-value="0.89" | 890 m || multiple || 2004–2021 || 27 Sep 2021 || 60 || align=left | Disc.: Spacewatch || 
|- id="2004 RJ161" bgcolor=#fefefe
| 1 ||  || MBA-I || 18.2 || data-sort-value="0.68" | 680 m || multiple || 2004–2019 || 19 Sep 2019 || 44 || align=left | Disc.: SpacewatchAlt.: 2008 UQ50 || 
|- id="2004 RK161" bgcolor=#E9E9E9
| 5 ||  || MBA-M || 18.3 || 3.8 km || multiple || 2004–2010 || 17 Mar 2010 || 18 || align=left | Disc.: SpacewatchAlt.: 2010 FL102 || 
|- id="2004 RX161" bgcolor=#E9E9E9
| 1 ||  || MBA-M || 17.3 || 1.5 km || multiple || 2004–2017 || 02 Jul 2017 || 33 || align=left | Disc.: LINEARAlt.: 2013 SQ3 || 
|- id="2004 RP162" bgcolor=#FA8072
| 1 ||  || MCA || 19.1 || data-sort-value="0.45" | 450 m || multiple || 2004–2018 || 11 Nov 2018 || 60 || align=left | Disc.: LINEAR || 
|- id="2004 RV162" bgcolor=#E9E9E9
| 0 ||  || MBA-M || 18.60 || data-sort-value="0.80" | 800 m || multiple || 2004–2021 || 03 Dec 2021 || 117 || align=left | Disc.: LINEAR || 
|- id="2004 RJ163" bgcolor=#d6d6d6
| 0 ||  || MBA-O || 15.98 || 3.5 km || multiple || 2004–2021 || 26 Nov 2021 || 179 || align=left | Disc.: Spacewatch || 
|- id="2004 RX163" bgcolor=#E9E9E9
| 0 ||  || MBA-M || 17.7 || 1.6 km || multiple || 2004–2019 || 01 Jan 2019 || 116 || align=left | Disc.: LINEARAlt.: 2018 RQ9 || 
|- id="2004 RY163" bgcolor=#E9E9E9
| 0 ||  || MBA-M || 17.41 || 1.4 km || multiple || 2004–2021 || 27 Nov 2021 || 90 || align=left | Disc.: LINEAR || 
|- id="2004 RZ163" bgcolor=#d6d6d6
| 0 ||  || MBA-O || 17.0 || 2.2 km || multiple || 2004–2021 || 13 Jan 2021 || 210 || align=left | Disc.: LINEAR || 
|- id="2004 RG164" bgcolor=#FFC2E0
| 5 ||  || APO || 25.8 || data-sort-value="0.025" | 25 m || single || 25 days || 05 Oct 2004 || 59 || align=left | Disc.: LINEARAMO at MPC || 
|- id="2004 RU164" bgcolor=#FFC2E0
| 4 ||  || AMO || 20.7 || data-sort-value="0.26" | 260 m || single || 59 days || 08 Nov 2004 || 22 || align=left | Disc.: SSS || 
|- id="2004 RV164" bgcolor=#FFC2E0
| 6 ||  || APO || 24.3 || data-sort-value="0.049" | 49 m || single || 25 days || 08 Oct 2004 || 85 || align=left | Disc.: LINEARAMO at MPC || 
|- id="2004 RX164" bgcolor=#FFC2E0
| 6 ||  || APO || 21.0 || data-sort-value="0.22" | 220 m || single || 27 days || 10 Oct 2004 || 62 || align=left | Disc.: LINEAR || 
|- id="2004 RY164" bgcolor=#FFC2E0
| 6 ||  || AMO || 20.7 || data-sort-value="0.26" | 260 m || single || 57 days || 09 Nov 2004 || 63 || align=left | Disc.: NEAT || 
|- id="2004 RZ164" bgcolor=#FFC2E0
| 0 ||  || APO || 19.0 || data-sort-value="0.56" | 560 m || multiple || 2004–2013 || 07 Mar 2013 || 782 || align=left | Disc.: SSSPotentially hazardous objectAMO at MPC || 
|- id="2004 RK165" bgcolor=#FA8072
| 2 ||  || MCA || 19.6 || data-sort-value="0.36" | 360 m || multiple || 2004–2020 || 19 Oct 2020 || 105 || align=left | Disc.: SpacewatchAlt.: 2020 ME11 || 
|- id="2004 RO165" bgcolor=#E9E9E9
| 1 ||  || MBA-M || 17.7 || data-sort-value="0.86" | 860 m || multiple || 2004–2018 || 06 Feb 2018 || 27 || align=left | Disc.: LINEARAlt.: 2008 QK7 || 
|- id="2004 RU165" bgcolor=#d6d6d6
| 0 ||  || MBA-O || 16.1 || 3.4 km || multiple || 2004–2020 || 10 Dec 2020 || 279 || align=left | Disc.: LINEAR || 
|- id="2004 RX165" bgcolor=#FFC2E0
| 4 ||  || AMO || 21.1 || data-sort-value="0.21" | 210 m || single || 91 days || 13 Dec 2004 || 49 || align=left | Disc.: SSS || 
|- id="2004 RY165" bgcolor=#FA8072
| – ||  || MCA || 20.8 || data-sort-value="0.21" | 210 m || single || 2 days || 15 Sep 2004 || 23 || align=left | Disc.: Spacewatch || 
|- id="2004 RE166" bgcolor=#E9E9E9
| 2 ||  || MBA-M || 17.9 || data-sort-value="0.78" | 780 m || multiple || 2004–2020 || 08 Aug 2020 || 38 || align=left | Disc.: LINEAR || 
|- id="2004 RL166" bgcolor=#E9E9E9
| 0 ||  || MBA-M || 17.93 || data-sort-value="0.77" | 770 m || multiple || 2004–2021 || 19 Nov 2021 || 89 || align=left | Disc.: LINEARAdded on 5 November 2021Alt.: 2011 CK142 || 
|- id="2004 RM166" bgcolor=#fefefe
| 0 ||  || MBA-I || 18.00 || data-sort-value="0.75" | 750 m || multiple || 2004–2021 || 08 Jul 2021 || 120 || align=left | Disc.: LINEAR || 
|- id="2004 RR166" bgcolor=#fefefe
| 0 ||  || MBA-I || 18.94 || data-sort-value="0.48" | 480 m || multiple || 2004–2021 || 06 Nov 2021 || 106 || align=left | Disc.: Spacewatch || 
|- id="2004 RX166" bgcolor=#FA8072
| 0 ||  || MCA || 18.45 || data-sort-value="0.61" | 610 m || multiple || 2004–2021 || 13 Apr 2021 || 48 || align=left | Disc.: SpacewatchAlt.: 2011 QE74 || 
|- id="2004 RY166" bgcolor=#E9E9E9
| 0 ||  || MBA-M || 17.68 || data-sort-value="0.87" | 870 m || multiple || 2004–2021 || 01 Dec 2021 || 40 || align=left | Disc.: Spacewatch || 
|- id="2004 RC167" bgcolor=#fefefe
| 0 ||  || MBA-I || 18.45 || data-sort-value="0.61" | 610 m || multiple || 2004–2021 || 19 May 2021 || 109 || align=left | Disc.: LINEARAlt.: 2014 HQ3, 2015 XR182 || 
|- id="2004 RM168" bgcolor=#fefefe
| 0 ||  || MBA-I || 17.9 || data-sort-value="0.78" | 780 m || multiple || 2004–2019 || 30 Nov 2019 || 148 || align=left | Disc.: LINEARAlt.: 2008 UX83 || 
|- id="2004 RZ168" bgcolor=#fefefe
| 1 ||  || MBA-I || 18.35 || data-sort-value="0.64" | 640 m || multiple || 2004–2021 || 14 Apr 2021 || 51 || align=left | Disc.: LINEAR || 
|- id="2004 RB169" bgcolor=#fefefe
| 0 ||  || MBA-I || 19.2 || data-sort-value="0.43" | 430 m || multiple || 2004–2020 || 14 Oct 2020 || 79 || align=left | Disc.: LINEARAlt.: 2013 HH42 || 
|- id="2004 RC169" bgcolor=#E9E9E9
| 0 ||  || MBA-M || 17.83 || 1.1 km || multiple || 2000–2021 || 25 Nov 2021 || 119 || align=left | Disc.: NEAT || 
|- id="2004 RE169" bgcolor=#E9E9E9
| 0 ||  || MBA-M || 16.98 || 2.2 km || multiple || 2004–2021 || 08 Jun 2021 || 143 || align=left | Disc.: NEATAlt.: 2013 TX67 || 
|- id="2004 RM169" bgcolor=#d6d6d6
| 0 ||  || MBA-O || 17.4 || 1.8 km || multiple || 2004–2020 || 03 Dec 2020 || 96 || align=left | Disc.: LINEARAlt.: 2015 TS301 || 
|- id="2004 RV169" bgcolor=#fefefe
| 0 ||  || MBA-I || 18.28 || data-sort-value="0.66" | 660 m || multiple || 2004–2021 || 15 Apr 2021 || 60 || align=left | Disc.: LINEARAlt.: 2007 GS14, 2015 TO73 || 
|- id="2004 RX169" bgcolor=#E9E9E9
| 0 ||  || MBA-M || 17.66 || 1.2 km || multiple || 2004–2021 || 14 Jun 2021 || 93 || align=left | Disc.: LINEAR || 
|- id="2004 RD170" bgcolor=#fefefe
| 0 ||  || MBA-I || 18.1 || data-sort-value="0.71" | 710 m || multiple || 2000–2019 || 26 Nov 2019 || 56 || align=left | Disc.: LINEAR || 
|- id="2004 RL170" bgcolor=#fefefe
| 0 ||  || MBA-I || 18.27 || data-sort-value="0.66" | 660 m || multiple || 2004–2021 || 10 May 2021 || 93 || align=left | Disc.: Apache Point || 
|- id="2004 RD171" bgcolor=#E9E9E9
| 0 ||  || MBA-M || 18.03 || data-sort-value="0.74" | 740 m || multiple || 2004–2021 || 09 Dec 2021 || 83 || align=left | Disc.: LINEAR || 
|- id="2004 RS171" bgcolor=#fefefe
| 0 ||  || MBA-I || 18.2 || data-sort-value="0.68" | 680 m || multiple || 2004–2019 || 24 Oct 2019 || 67 || align=left | Disc.: LINEAR || 
|- id="2004 RA172" bgcolor=#E9E9E9
| 0 ||  || MBA-M || 17.91 || data-sort-value="0.78" | 780 m || multiple || 2004–2021 || 09 Dec 2021 || 122 || align=left | Disc.: LINEARAlt.: 2008 PF13 || 
|- id="2004 RL172" bgcolor=#d6d6d6
| 0 ||  || MBA-O || 17.41 || 1.8 km || multiple || 2004–2022 || 07 Jan 2022 || 54 || align=left | Disc.: SpacewatchAdded on 17 January 2021Alt.: 2015 XY41 || 
|- id="2004 RA173" bgcolor=#d6d6d6
| 3 ||  || MBA-O || 17.2 || 2.0 km || multiple || 2004–2019 || 21 Oct 2019 || 35 || align=left | Disc.: Spacewatch || 
|- id="2004 RX174" bgcolor=#E9E9E9
| 0 ||  || MBA-M || 17.95 || 1.1 km || multiple || 2004–2021 || 27 Nov 2021 || 180 || align=left | Disc.: LINEAR || 
|- id="2004 RB176" bgcolor=#E9E9E9
| – ||  || MBA-M || 17.4 || 1.4 km || single || 13 days || 23 Sep 2004 || 13 || align=left | Disc.: LINEAR || 
|- id="2004 RE176" bgcolor=#fefefe
| 1 ||  || MBA-I || 18.3 || 1.7 km || multiple || 2004–2020 || 27 Jan 2020 || 133 || align=left | Disc.: LINEAR || 
|- id="2004 RV176" bgcolor=#E9E9E9
| 0 ||  || MBA-M || 17.6 || 1.7 km || multiple || 2004–2018 || 13 Dec 2018 || 100 || align=left | Disc.: LINEAR || 
|- id="2004 RD177" bgcolor=#E9E9E9
| 0 ||  || MBA-M || 18.20 || data-sort-value="0.68" | 680 m || multiple || 2004–2022 || 04 Jan 2022 || 35 || align=left | Disc.: LINEAR || 
|- id="2004 RE177" bgcolor=#d6d6d6
| 0 ||  || MBA-O || 16.8 || 2.4 km || multiple || 1999–2021 || 06 Jan 2021 || 86 || align=left | Disc.: LINEARAdded on 17 January 2021Alt.: 2019 MW14 || 
|- id="2004 RF177" bgcolor=#E9E9E9
| 0 ||  || MBA-M || 17.62 || 1.3 km || multiple || 2000–2021 || 25 Nov 2021 || 146 || align=left | Disc.: LINEAR || 
|- id="2004 RP180" bgcolor=#fefefe
| 0 ||  || MBA-I || 18.4 || data-sort-value="0.62" | 620 m || multiple || 2004–2020 || 25 Jan 2020 || 88 || align=left | Disc.: LINEARAlt.: 2015 XH2 || 
|- id="2004 RF181" bgcolor=#E9E9E9
| 1 ||  || MBA-M || 17.99 || 1.4 km || multiple || 2004–2018 || 06 Nov 2018 || 50 || align=left | Disc.: LINEARAlt.: 2017 GU14 || 
|- id="2004 RR181" bgcolor=#FA8072
| 0 ||  || MCA || 19.63 || data-sort-value="0.35" | 350 m || multiple || 2004–2019 || 02 Nov 2019 || 53 || align=left | Disc.: LINEARAlt.: 2015 PV57 || 
|- id="2004 RV183" bgcolor=#E9E9E9
| 0 ||  || MBA-M || 17.38 || 1.9 km || multiple || 1995–2021 || 31 May 2021 || 129 || align=left | Disc.: LINEAR || 
|- id="2004 RF185" bgcolor=#E9E9E9
| 0 ||  || MBA-M || 17.63 || 1.7 km || multiple || 2004–2021 || 09 May 2021 || 52 || align=left | Disc.: LINEAR || 
|- id="2004 RL187" bgcolor=#FA8072
| 0 ||  || MCA || 17.79 || 1.2 km || multiple || 2004–2022 || 21 Jan 2022 || 171 || align=left | Disc.: LINEARAlt.: 2014 EG1 || 
|- id="2004 RJ188" bgcolor=#fefefe
| 2 ||  || MBA-I || 18.4 || data-sort-value="0.62" | 620 m || multiple || 2004–2018 || 06 Oct 2018 || 73 || align=left | Disc.: LINEARAlt.: 2011 TU || 
|- id="2004 RZ194" bgcolor=#E9E9E9
| 0 ||  || MBA-M || 17.63 || 1.3 km || multiple || 2004–2022 || 04 Jan 2022 || 123 || align=left | Disc.: LINEAR || 
|- id="2004 RF199" bgcolor=#E9E9E9
| 0 ||  || MBA-M || 17.37 || 1.0 km || multiple || 2004–2022 || 07 Jan 2022 || 109 || align=left | Disc.: LINEAR || 
|- id="2004 RN199" bgcolor=#E9E9E9
| 1 ||  || MBA-M || 18.28 || data-sort-value="0.93" | 930 m || multiple || 2004–2021 || 06 Oct 2021 || 111 || align=left | Disc.: SpacewatchAlt.: 2017 UT72 || 
|- id="2004 RP199" bgcolor=#E9E9E9
| 1 ||  || MBA-M || 18.59 || data-sort-value="0.80" | 800 m || multiple || 2004–2021 || 07 Nov 2021 || 60 || align=left | Disc.: SpacewatchAlt.: 2017 UP75 || 
|- id="2004 RY199" bgcolor=#fefefe
| 2 ||  || MBA-I || 18.7 || data-sort-value="0.54" | 540 m || multiple || 2004–2020 || 16 Dec 2020 || 69 || align=left | Disc.: Spacewatch || 
|}
back to top

References 
 

Lists of unnumbered minor planets